

499001–499100 

|-bgcolor=#d6d6d6
| 499001 ||  || — || February 1, 2009 || Kitt Peak || Spacewatch ||  || align=right | 1.6 km || 
|-id=002 bgcolor=#fefefe
| 499002 ||  || — || February 1, 2009 || Kitt Peak || Spacewatch ||  || align=right data-sort-value="0.63" | 630 m || 
|-id=003 bgcolor=#fefefe
| 499003 ||  || — || January 17, 2009 || Kitt Peak || Spacewatch ||  || align=right data-sort-value="0.64" | 640 m || 
|-id=004 bgcolor=#fefefe
| 499004 ||  || — || February 1, 2009 || Kitt Peak || Spacewatch ||  || align=right data-sort-value="0.71" | 710 m || 
|-id=005 bgcolor=#d6d6d6
| 499005 ||  || — || February 1, 2009 || Mount Lemmon || Mount Lemmon Survey ||  || align=right | 2.2 km || 
|-id=006 bgcolor=#fefefe
| 499006 ||  || — || February 1, 2009 || Kitt Peak || Spacewatch ||  || align=right data-sort-value="0.58" | 580 m || 
|-id=007 bgcolor=#d6d6d6
| 499007 ||  || — || November 20, 2007 || Mount Lemmon || Mount Lemmon Survey ||  || align=right | 3.0 km || 
|-id=008 bgcolor=#d6d6d6
| 499008 ||  || — || November 3, 2007 || Mount Lemmon || Mount Lemmon Survey || EOS || align=right | 1.8 km || 
|-id=009 bgcolor=#fefefe
| 499009 ||  || — || January 20, 2009 || Kitt Peak || Spacewatch ||  || align=right data-sort-value="0.66" | 660 m || 
|-id=010 bgcolor=#fefefe
| 499010 ||  || — || February 14, 2009 || Kitt Peak || Spacewatch ||  || align=right data-sort-value="0.73" | 730 m || 
|-id=011 bgcolor=#d6d6d6
| 499011 ||  || — || February 14, 2009 || Kitt Peak || Spacewatch ||  || align=right | 2.3 km || 
|-id=012 bgcolor=#fefefe
| 499012 ||  || — || December 29, 2008 || Kitt Peak || Spacewatch ||  || align=right data-sort-value="0.55" | 550 m || 
|-id=013 bgcolor=#d6d6d6
| 499013 ||  || — || February 14, 2009 || La Sagra || OAM Obs. ||  || align=right | 3.4 km || 
|-id=014 bgcolor=#d6d6d6
| 499014 ||  || — || February 14, 2009 || La Sagra || OAM Obs. ||  || align=right | 2.8 km || 
|-id=015 bgcolor=#fefefe
| 499015 ||  || — || January 25, 2009 || Kitt Peak || Spacewatch ||  || align=right data-sort-value="0.64" | 640 m || 
|-id=016 bgcolor=#d6d6d6
| 499016 ||  || — || January 16, 2009 || Kitt Peak || Spacewatch ||  || align=right | 2.4 km || 
|-id=017 bgcolor=#fefefe
| 499017 ||  || — || February 1, 2009 || Kitt Peak || Spacewatch ||  || align=right data-sort-value="0.65" | 650 m || 
|-id=018 bgcolor=#d6d6d6
| 499018 ||  || — || February 3, 2009 || Kitt Peak || Spacewatch || HYG || align=right | 2.6 km || 
|-id=019 bgcolor=#d6d6d6
| 499019 ||  || — || December 30, 2008 || Mount Lemmon || Mount Lemmon Survey ||  || align=right | 2.1 km || 
|-id=020 bgcolor=#fefefe
| 499020 ||  || — || February 3, 2009 || Kitt Peak || Spacewatch ||  || align=right data-sort-value="0.76" | 760 m || 
|-id=021 bgcolor=#d6d6d6
| 499021 ||  || — || February 13, 2009 || Mount Lemmon || Mount Lemmon Survey ||  || align=right | 2.7 km || 
|-id=022 bgcolor=#fefefe
| 499022 ||  || — || January 30, 2009 || Mount Lemmon || Mount Lemmon Survey ||  || align=right data-sort-value="0.59" | 590 m || 
|-id=023 bgcolor=#d6d6d6
| 499023 ||  || — || February 19, 2009 || Kitt Peak || Spacewatch || EOS || align=right | 3.4 km || 
|-id=024 bgcolor=#d6d6d6
| 499024 ||  || — || February 4, 2009 || Kitt Peak || Spacewatch || ALA || align=right | 3.4 km || 
|-id=025 bgcolor=#d6d6d6
| 499025 ||  || — || January 15, 2009 || Kitt Peak || Spacewatch ||  || align=right | 2.3 km || 
|-id=026 bgcolor=#d6d6d6
| 499026 ||  || — || January 18, 2009 || Kitt Peak || Spacewatch ||  || align=right | 2.3 km || 
|-id=027 bgcolor=#d6d6d6
| 499027 ||  || — || February 2, 2009 || Mount Lemmon || Mount Lemmon Survey ||  || align=right | 2.7 km || 
|-id=028 bgcolor=#d6d6d6
| 499028 ||  || — || January 31, 2009 || Kitt Peak || Spacewatch ||  || align=right | 2.5 km || 
|-id=029 bgcolor=#d6d6d6
| 499029 ||  || — || September 27, 2006 || Kitt Peak || Spacewatch ||  || align=right | 2.5 km || 
|-id=030 bgcolor=#fefefe
| 499030 ||  || — || February 19, 2009 || La Sagra || OAM Obs. ||  || align=right data-sort-value="0.52" | 520 m || 
|-id=031 bgcolor=#fefefe
| 499031 ||  || — || February 18, 2009 || La Sagra || OAM Obs. ||  || align=right data-sort-value="0.87" | 870 m || 
|-id=032 bgcolor=#fefefe
| 499032 ||  || — || February 20, 2009 || Mount Lemmon || Mount Lemmon Survey ||  || align=right data-sort-value="0.81" | 810 m || 
|-id=033 bgcolor=#d6d6d6
| 499033 ||  || — || February 20, 2009 || Catalina || CSS || VER || align=right | 2.9 km || 
|-id=034 bgcolor=#d6d6d6
| 499034 ||  || — || November 4, 2007 || Kitt Peak || Spacewatch ||  || align=right | 2.2 km || 
|-id=035 bgcolor=#fefefe
| 499035 ||  || — || January 31, 2009 || Kitt Peak || Spacewatch ||  || align=right data-sort-value="0.67" | 670 m || 
|-id=036 bgcolor=#fefefe
| 499036 ||  || — || February 1, 2009 || Mount Lemmon || Mount Lemmon Survey || NYS || align=right data-sort-value="0.52" | 520 m || 
|-id=037 bgcolor=#d6d6d6
| 499037 ||  || — || February 22, 2009 || Kitt Peak || Spacewatch ||  || align=right | 2.4 km || 
|-id=038 bgcolor=#fefefe
| 499038 ||  || — || February 4, 2009 || Mount Lemmon || Mount Lemmon Survey ||  || align=right data-sort-value="0.55" | 550 m || 
|-id=039 bgcolor=#d6d6d6
| 499039 ||  || — || February 4, 2009 || Mount Lemmon || Mount Lemmon Survey ||  || align=right | 2.7 km || 
|-id=040 bgcolor=#fefefe
| 499040 ||  || — || February 22, 2009 || Kitt Peak || Spacewatch ||  || align=right data-sort-value="0.66" | 660 m || 
|-id=041 bgcolor=#d6d6d6
| 499041 ||  || — || February 22, 2009 || Kitt Peak || Spacewatch ||  || align=right | 2.3 km || 
|-id=042 bgcolor=#d6d6d6
| 499042 ||  || — || February 22, 2009 || Mount Lemmon || Mount Lemmon Survey || (1118) || align=right | 2.9 km || 
|-id=043 bgcolor=#d6d6d6
| 499043 ||  || — || January 25, 2009 || Kitt Peak || Spacewatch ||  || align=right | 2.5 km || 
|-id=044 bgcolor=#d6d6d6
| 499044 ||  || — || February 22, 2009 || Kitt Peak || Spacewatch || TIR || align=right | 2.6 km || 
|-id=045 bgcolor=#fefefe
| 499045 ||  || — || February 22, 2009 || Kitt Peak || Spacewatch ||  || align=right data-sort-value="0.67" | 670 m || 
|-id=046 bgcolor=#d6d6d6
| 499046 ||  || — || January 15, 2009 || Kitt Peak || Spacewatch ||  || align=right | 1.9 km || 
|-id=047 bgcolor=#d6d6d6
| 499047 ||  || — || January 31, 2009 || Kitt Peak || Spacewatch ||  || align=right | 2.5 km || 
|-id=048 bgcolor=#fefefe
| 499048 ||  || — || February 3, 2009 || Mount Lemmon || Mount Lemmon Survey ||  || align=right data-sort-value="0.67" | 670 m || 
|-id=049 bgcolor=#fefefe
| 499049 ||  || — || February 19, 2009 || Kitt Peak || Spacewatch ||  || align=right data-sort-value="0.76" | 760 m || 
|-id=050 bgcolor=#d6d6d6
| 499050 ||  || — || February 27, 2009 || Kitt Peak || Spacewatch ||  || align=right | 2.2 km || 
|-id=051 bgcolor=#d6d6d6
| 499051 ||  || — || January 25, 2009 || Kitt Peak || Spacewatch || VER || align=right | 2.2 km || 
|-id=052 bgcolor=#fefefe
| 499052 ||  || — || February 19, 2009 || Kitt Peak || Spacewatch ||  || align=right data-sort-value="0.59" | 590 m || 
|-id=053 bgcolor=#d6d6d6
| 499053 ||  || — || October 10, 2007 || Mount Lemmon || Mount Lemmon Survey ||  || align=right | 2.0 km || 
|-id=054 bgcolor=#d6d6d6
| 499054 ||  || — || February 26, 2009 || Kitt Peak || Spacewatch ||  || align=right | 2.3 km || 
|-id=055 bgcolor=#fefefe
| 499055 ||  || — || February 26, 2009 || Kitt Peak || Spacewatch || MAS || align=right data-sort-value="0.52" | 520 m || 
|-id=056 bgcolor=#fefefe
| 499056 ||  || — || February 4, 2009 || Mount Lemmon || Mount Lemmon Survey ||  || align=right data-sort-value="0.63" | 630 m || 
|-id=057 bgcolor=#fefefe
| 499057 ||  || — || February 27, 2009 || Kitt Peak || Spacewatch ||  || align=right data-sort-value="0.48" | 480 m || 
|-id=058 bgcolor=#d6d6d6
| 499058 ||  || — || January 31, 2009 || Mount Lemmon || Mount Lemmon Survey ||  || align=right | 2.7 km || 
|-id=059 bgcolor=#d6d6d6
| 499059 ||  || — || August 28, 2006 || Kitt Peak || Spacewatch || VER || align=right | 2.6 km || 
|-id=060 bgcolor=#fefefe
| 499060 ||  || — || February 27, 2009 || Kitt Peak || Spacewatch || NYS || align=right data-sort-value="0.54" | 540 m || 
|-id=061 bgcolor=#fefefe
| 499061 ||  || — || February 27, 2009 || Kitt Peak || Spacewatch ||  || align=right data-sort-value="0.79" | 790 m || 
|-id=062 bgcolor=#fefefe
| 499062 ||  || — || February 20, 2009 || Kitt Peak || Spacewatch ||  || align=right data-sort-value="0.82" | 820 m || 
|-id=063 bgcolor=#d6d6d6
| 499063 ||  || — || February 21, 2009 || Kitt Peak || Spacewatch ||  || align=right | 2.2 km || 
|-id=064 bgcolor=#d6d6d6
| 499064 ||  || — || February 27, 2009 || Kitt Peak || Spacewatch ||  || align=right | 2.4 km || 
|-id=065 bgcolor=#d6d6d6
| 499065 ||  || — || January 19, 2009 || Mount Lemmon || Mount Lemmon Survey ||  || align=right | 2.6 km || 
|-id=066 bgcolor=#d6d6d6
| 499066 ||  || — || February 26, 2009 || Kitt Peak || Spacewatch || VER || align=right | 2.4 km || 
|-id=067 bgcolor=#fefefe
| 499067 ||  || — || February 4, 2005 || Mount Lemmon || Mount Lemmon Survey || NYS || align=right data-sort-value="0.71" | 710 m || 
|-id=068 bgcolor=#d6d6d6
| 499068 ||  || — || February 16, 2009 || Kitt Peak || Spacewatch ||  || align=right | 2.6 km || 
|-id=069 bgcolor=#d6d6d6
| 499069 ||  || — || March 1, 2009 || Tzec Maun || F. Tozzi ||  || align=right | 4.9 km || 
|-id=070 bgcolor=#fefefe
| 499070 ||  || — || January 19, 2009 || Mount Lemmon || Mount Lemmon Survey ||  || align=right data-sort-value="0.58" | 580 m || 
|-id=071 bgcolor=#d6d6d6
| 499071 ||  || — || February 14, 2009 || Kitt Peak || Spacewatch || EOS || align=right | 2.0 km || 
|-id=072 bgcolor=#fefefe
| 499072 ||  || — || March 1, 2009 || Kitt Peak || Spacewatch || MAS || align=right data-sort-value="0.55" | 550 m || 
|-id=073 bgcolor=#fefefe
| 499073 ||  || — || April 2, 2006 || Kitt Peak || Spacewatch ||  || align=right data-sort-value="0.63" | 630 m || 
|-id=074 bgcolor=#d6d6d6
| 499074 ||  || — || March 1, 2009 || Kitt Peak || Spacewatch || VER || align=right | 2.5 km || 
|-id=075 bgcolor=#fefefe
| 499075 ||  || — || February 24, 2009 || Kitt Peak || Spacewatch ||  || align=right data-sort-value="0.74" | 740 m || 
|-id=076 bgcolor=#d6d6d6
| 499076 ||  || — || March 2, 2009 || Kitt Peak || Spacewatch || EOS || align=right | 2.9 km || 
|-id=077 bgcolor=#fefefe
| 499077 ||  || — || March 1, 2009 || Mount Lemmon || Mount Lemmon Survey ||  || align=right data-sort-value="0.77" | 770 m || 
|-id=078 bgcolor=#fefefe
| 499078 ||  || — || February 26, 2009 || Mount Lemmon || Mount Lemmon Survey || MAS || align=right data-sort-value="0.66" | 660 m || 
|-id=079 bgcolor=#d6d6d6
| 499079 ||  || — || March 17, 2009 || Heppenheim || Starkenburg Obs. ||  || align=right | 2.2 km || 
|-id=080 bgcolor=#fefefe
| 499080 ||  || — || February 28, 2009 || Mount Lemmon || Mount Lemmon Survey ||  || align=right data-sort-value="0.85" | 850 m || 
|-id=081 bgcolor=#d6d6d6
| 499081 ||  || — || March 3, 2009 || Mount Lemmon || Mount Lemmon Survey ||  || align=right | 2.3 km || 
|-id=082 bgcolor=#fefefe
| 499082 ||  || — || March 1, 2009 || Kitt Peak || Spacewatch ||  || align=right data-sort-value="0.68" | 680 m || 
|-id=083 bgcolor=#d6d6d6
| 499083 ||  || — || February 13, 2009 || Kitt Peak || Spacewatch ||  || align=right | 3.4 km || 
|-id=084 bgcolor=#d6d6d6
| 499084 ||  || — || February 19, 2009 || Kitt Peak || Spacewatch ||  || align=right | 3.1 km || 
|-id=085 bgcolor=#fefefe
| 499085 ||  || — || February 1, 2009 || Kitt Peak || Spacewatch ||  || align=right data-sort-value="0.67" | 670 m || 
|-id=086 bgcolor=#d6d6d6
| 499086 ||  || — || January 30, 2009 || Mount Lemmon || Mount Lemmon Survey ||  || align=right | 2.3 km || 
|-id=087 bgcolor=#fefefe
| 499087 ||  || — || March 19, 2009 || La Sagra || OAM Obs. || NYS || align=right data-sort-value="0.57" | 570 m || 
|-id=088 bgcolor=#d6d6d6
| 499088 ||  || — || March 16, 2009 || Kanab || E. E. Sheridan ||  || align=right | 3.3 km || 
|-id=089 bgcolor=#fefefe
| 499089 ||  || — || March 1, 2009 || Kitt Peak || Spacewatch ||  || align=right data-sort-value="0.77" | 770 m || 
|-id=090 bgcolor=#d6d6d6
| 499090 ||  || — || March 17, 2009 || La Sagra || OAM Obs. || Tj (2.95) || align=right | 4.0 km || 
|-id=091 bgcolor=#d6d6d6
| 499091 ||  || — || December 29, 2008 || Mount Lemmon || Mount Lemmon Survey ||  || align=right | 3.0 km || 
|-id=092 bgcolor=#d6d6d6
| 499092 ||  || — || March 28, 2009 || Catalina || CSS || EUP || align=right | 3.9 km || 
|-id=093 bgcolor=#fefefe
| 499093 ||  || — || February 5, 2009 || Mount Lemmon || Mount Lemmon Survey ||  || align=right data-sort-value="0.81" | 810 m || 
|-id=094 bgcolor=#d6d6d6
| 499094 ||  || — || March 1, 2009 || Kitt Peak || Spacewatch ||  || align=right | 3.1 km || 
|-id=095 bgcolor=#fefefe
| 499095 ||  || — || March 21, 2009 || Kitt Peak || Spacewatch ||  || align=right data-sort-value="0.80" | 800 m || 
|-id=096 bgcolor=#fefefe
| 499096 ||  || — || February 26, 2009 || Kitt Peak || Spacewatch ||  || align=right data-sort-value="0.50" | 500 m || 
|-id=097 bgcolor=#fefefe
| 499097 ||  || — || March 21, 2009 || Kitt Peak || Spacewatch || MAS || align=right data-sort-value="0.59" | 590 m || 
|-id=098 bgcolor=#fefefe
| 499098 ||  || — || March 19, 2009 || Kitt Peak || Spacewatch || NYS || align=right data-sort-value="0.60" | 600 m || 
|-id=099 bgcolor=#fefefe
| 499099 ||  || — || January 15, 2005 || Kitt Peak || Spacewatch || EUT || align=right data-sort-value="0.62" | 620 m || 
|-id=100 bgcolor=#fefefe
| 499100 ||  || — || March 23, 2009 || XuYi || PMO NEO ||  || align=right data-sort-value="0.68" | 680 m || 
|}

499101–499200 

|-bgcolor=#fefefe
| 499101 ||  || — || March 19, 2009 || Catalina || CSS ||  || align=right | 1.1 km || 
|-id=102 bgcolor=#fefefe
| 499102 ||  || — || March 19, 2009 || Kitt Peak || Spacewatch ||  || align=right data-sort-value="0.75" | 750 m || 
|-id=103 bgcolor=#fefefe
| 499103 ||  || — || March 21, 2009 || Kitt Peak || Spacewatch ||  || align=right data-sort-value="0.72" | 720 m || 
|-id=104 bgcolor=#fefefe
| 499104 ||  || — || April 2, 2009 || Mount Lemmon || Mount Lemmon Survey ||  || align=right data-sort-value="0.59" | 590 m || 
|-id=105 bgcolor=#d6d6d6
| 499105 ||  || — || April 17, 2009 || Kitt Peak || Spacewatch ||  || align=right | 2.2 km || 
|-id=106 bgcolor=#fefefe
| 499106 ||  || — || April 2, 2009 || Kitt Peak || Spacewatch ||  || align=right data-sort-value="0.70" | 700 m || 
|-id=107 bgcolor=#fefefe
| 499107 ||  || — || April 18, 2009 || Mount Lemmon || Mount Lemmon Survey ||  || align=right data-sort-value="0.87" | 870 m || 
|-id=108 bgcolor=#d6d6d6
| 499108 ||  || — || April 18, 2009 || Kitt Peak || Spacewatch ||  || align=right | 3.5 km || 
|-id=109 bgcolor=#d6d6d6
| 499109 ||  || — || March 2, 2009 || Mount Lemmon || Mount Lemmon Survey ||  || align=right | 2.8 km || 
|-id=110 bgcolor=#d6d6d6
| 499110 ||  || — || March 31, 2009 || Mount Lemmon || Mount Lemmon Survey ||  || align=right | 2.4 km || 
|-id=111 bgcolor=#fefefe
| 499111 ||  || — || March 18, 2009 || Kitt Peak || Spacewatch || MAS || align=right data-sort-value="0.71" | 710 m || 
|-id=112 bgcolor=#fefefe
| 499112 ||  || — || April 20, 2009 || Kitt Peak || Spacewatch ||  || align=right data-sort-value="0.53" | 530 m || 
|-id=113 bgcolor=#C2FFFF
| 499113 ||  || — || April 20, 2009 || Kitt Peak || Spacewatch || L5 || align=right | 7.4 km || 
|-id=114 bgcolor=#fefefe
| 499114 ||  || — || March 21, 2009 || Catalina || CSS ||  || align=right data-sort-value="0.90" | 900 m || 
|-id=115 bgcolor=#fefefe
| 499115 ||  || — || March 19, 2009 || Kitt Peak || Spacewatch ||  || align=right data-sort-value="0.76" | 760 m || 
|-id=116 bgcolor=#FA8072
| 499116 ||  || — || April 24, 2009 || Mount Lemmon || Mount Lemmon Survey ||  || align=right data-sort-value="0.58" | 580 m || 
|-id=117 bgcolor=#fefefe
| 499117 ||  || — || April 27, 2009 || XuYi || PMO NEO ||  || align=right data-sort-value="0.80" | 800 m || 
|-id=118 bgcolor=#d6d6d6
| 499118 ||  || — || April 19, 2009 || Mount Lemmon || Mount Lemmon Survey ||  || align=right | 2.8 km || 
|-id=119 bgcolor=#d6d6d6
| 499119 ||  || — || April 20, 2009 || Mount Lemmon || Mount Lemmon Survey || THM || align=right | 1.9 km || 
|-id=120 bgcolor=#fefefe
| 499120 ||  || — || April 20, 2009 || Mount Lemmon || Mount Lemmon Survey ||  || align=right data-sort-value="0.60" | 600 m || 
|-id=121 bgcolor=#fefefe
| 499121 ||  || — || March 21, 2009 || Kitt Peak || Spacewatch || NYS || align=right data-sort-value="0.56" | 560 m || 
|-id=122 bgcolor=#fefefe
| 499122 ||  || — || May 14, 2009 || Siding Spring || SSS ||  || align=right data-sort-value="0.89" | 890 m || 
|-id=123 bgcolor=#fefefe
| 499123 ||  || — || May 20, 2009 || Mayhill || A. Lowe ||  || align=right data-sort-value="0.89" | 890 m || 
|-id=124 bgcolor=#fefefe
| 499124 ||  || — || May 14, 2009 || Kitt Peak || Spacewatch ||  || align=right data-sort-value="0.90" | 900 m || 
|-id=125 bgcolor=#fefefe
| 499125 ||  || — || May 28, 2009 || Mount Lemmon || Mount Lemmon Survey || MAS || align=right data-sort-value="0.63" | 630 m || 
|-id=126 bgcolor=#fefefe
| 499126 ||  || — || May 27, 2009 || La Sagra || OAM Obs. || NYS || align=right data-sort-value="0.69" | 690 m || 
|-id=127 bgcolor=#fefefe
| 499127 ||  || — || May 16, 2009 || Kitt Peak || Spacewatch ||  || align=right data-sort-value="0.79" | 790 m || 
|-id=128 bgcolor=#fefefe
| 499128 ||  || — || July 19, 2009 || La Sagra || OAM Obs. ||  || align=right | 1.4 km || 
|-id=129 bgcolor=#E9E9E9
| 499129 ||  || — || October 3, 2005 || Kitt Peak || Spacewatch ||  || align=right data-sort-value="0.47" | 470 m || 
|-id=130 bgcolor=#E9E9E9
| 499130 ||  || — || August 15, 2009 || Kitt Peak || Spacewatch ||  || align=right data-sort-value="0.61" | 610 m || 
|-id=131 bgcolor=#d6d6d6
| 499131 ||  || — || July 14, 2009 || Kitt Peak || Spacewatch || Tj (2.95) || align=right | 3.7 km || 
|-id=132 bgcolor=#d6d6d6
| 499132 ||  || — || August 15, 2009 || Kitt Peak || Spacewatch || Tj (2.97) || align=right | 3.7 km || 
|-id=133 bgcolor=#E9E9E9
| 499133 ||  || — || August 20, 2009 || La Sagra || OAM Obs. ||  || align=right | 1.3 km || 
|-id=134 bgcolor=#E9E9E9
| 499134 ||  || — || September 29, 2005 || Catalina || CSS ||  || align=right data-sort-value="0.94" | 940 m || 
|-id=135 bgcolor=#fefefe
| 499135 ||  || — || August 18, 2009 || La Sagra || OAM Obs. || H || align=right data-sort-value="0.92" | 920 m || 
|-id=136 bgcolor=#fefefe
| 499136 ||  || — || July 29, 2009 || Catalina || CSS || H || align=right data-sort-value="0.83" | 830 m || 
|-id=137 bgcolor=#E9E9E9
| 499137 ||  || — || August 30, 2009 || Altschwendt || W. Ries ||  || align=right | 1.2 km || 
|-id=138 bgcolor=#d6d6d6
| 499138 ||  || — || August 26, 2009 || Catalina || CSS || Tj (2.97) || align=right | 3.9 km || 
|-id=139 bgcolor=#fefefe
| 499139 ||  || — || August 26, 2009 || La Sagra || OAM Obs. ||  || align=right data-sort-value="0.72" | 720 m || 
|-id=140 bgcolor=#FA8072
| 499140 ||  || — || September 10, 2009 || La Sagra || OAM Obs. ||  || align=right data-sort-value="0.78" | 780 m || 
|-id=141 bgcolor=#E9E9E9
| 499141 ||  || — || September 12, 2009 || Kitt Peak || Spacewatch ||  || align=right | 1.1 km || 
|-id=142 bgcolor=#E9E9E9
| 499142 ||  || — || September 12, 2009 || Kitt Peak || Spacewatch ||  || align=right | 1.6 km || 
|-id=143 bgcolor=#E9E9E9
| 499143 ||  || — || September 12, 2009 || Kitt Peak || Spacewatch ||  || align=right | 1.2 km || 
|-id=144 bgcolor=#E9E9E9
| 499144 ||  || — || September 12, 2009 || Kitt Peak || Spacewatch ||  || align=right data-sort-value="0.69" | 690 m || 
|-id=145 bgcolor=#E9E9E9
| 499145 ||  || — || September 13, 2009 || Purple Mountain || PMO NEO ||  || align=right data-sort-value="0.78" | 780 m || 
|-id=146 bgcolor=#E9E9E9
| 499146 ||  || — || September 14, 2009 || Kitt Peak || Spacewatch ||  || align=right data-sort-value="0.73" | 730 m || 
|-id=147 bgcolor=#E9E9E9
| 499147 ||  || — || September 15, 2009 || Kitt Peak || Spacewatch ||  || align=right data-sort-value="0.56" | 560 m || 
|-id=148 bgcolor=#E9E9E9
| 499148 ||  || — || September 15, 2009 || Kitt Peak || Spacewatch || KON || align=right | 1.8 km || 
|-id=149 bgcolor=#E9E9E9
| 499149 ||  || — || September 15, 2009 || Kitt Peak || Spacewatch ||  || align=right | 1.3 km || 
|-id=150 bgcolor=#E9E9E9
| 499150 ||  || — || September 15, 2009 || Kitt Peak || Spacewatch ||  || align=right data-sort-value="0.61" | 610 m || 
|-id=151 bgcolor=#E9E9E9
| 499151 ||  || — || April 23, 2007 || Mount Lemmon || Mount Lemmon Survey ||  || align=right | 2.8 km || 
|-id=152 bgcolor=#E9E9E9
| 499152 ||  || — || September 14, 2009 || Kitt Peak || Spacewatch || (194) || align=right | 2.4 km || 
|-id=153 bgcolor=#E9E9E9
| 499153 ||  || — || September 15, 2009 || Kitt Peak || Spacewatch ||  || align=right data-sort-value="0.80" | 800 m || 
|-id=154 bgcolor=#fefefe
| 499154 ||  || — || June 29, 2005 || Kitt Peak || Spacewatch ||  || align=right data-sort-value="0.76" | 760 m || 
|-id=155 bgcolor=#E9E9E9
| 499155 ||  || — || September 16, 2009 || Kitt Peak || Spacewatch ||  || align=right | 1.4 km || 
|-id=156 bgcolor=#E9E9E9
| 499156 ||  || — || September 16, 2009 || Kitt Peak || Spacewatch ||  || align=right | 1.1 km || 
|-id=157 bgcolor=#E9E9E9
| 499157 ||  || — || September 16, 2009 || Kitt Peak || Spacewatch ||  || align=right data-sort-value="0.71" | 710 m || 
|-id=158 bgcolor=#E9E9E9
| 499158 ||  || — || November 25, 2005 || Kitt Peak || Spacewatch ||  || align=right | 1.2 km || 
|-id=159 bgcolor=#E9E9E9
| 499159 ||  || — || September 16, 2009 || Kitt Peak || Spacewatch ||  || align=right | 1.0 km || 
|-id=160 bgcolor=#E9E9E9
| 499160 ||  || — || August 16, 2009 || Kitt Peak || Spacewatch ||  || align=right data-sort-value="0.78" | 780 m || 
|-id=161 bgcolor=#E9E9E9
| 499161 ||  || — || September 17, 2009 || Kitt Peak || Spacewatch ||  || align=right data-sort-value="0.57" | 570 m || 
|-id=162 bgcolor=#d6d6d6
| 499162 ||  || — || September 17, 2009 || Mount Lemmon || Mount Lemmon Survey || 3:2 || align=right | 4.0 km || 
|-id=163 bgcolor=#E9E9E9
| 499163 ||  || — || September 17, 2009 || Kitt Peak || Spacewatch || KON || align=right | 1.8 km || 
|-id=164 bgcolor=#E9E9E9
| 499164 ||  || — || September 17, 2009 || Kitt Peak || Spacewatch ||  || align=right data-sort-value="0.68" | 680 m || 
|-id=165 bgcolor=#E9E9E9
| 499165 ||  || — || September 17, 2009 || Kitt Peak || Spacewatch ||  || align=right | 1.3 km || 
|-id=166 bgcolor=#fefefe
| 499166 ||  || — || September 17, 2009 || Kitt Peak || Spacewatch || H || align=right data-sort-value="0.62" | 620 m || 
|-id=167 bgcolor=#E9E9E9
| 499167 ||  || — || September 17, 2009 || Mount Lemmon || Mount Lemmon Survey ||  || align=right data-sort-value="0.67" | 670 m || 
|-id=168 bgcolor=#E9E9E9
| 499168 ||  || — || September 17, 2009 || Kitt Peak || Spacewatch ||  || align=right | 1.1 km || 
|-id=169 bgcolor=#E9E9E9
| 499169 ||  || — || September 20, 2009 || Mount Lemmon || Mount Lemmon Survey ||  || align=right data-sort-value="0.86" | 860 m || 
|-id=170 bgcolor=#E9E9E9
| 499170 ||  || — || September 23, 2009 || Tzec Maun || Tzec Maun Obs. ||  || align=right data-sort-value="0.95" | 950 m || 
|-id=171 bgcolor=#E9E9E9
| 499171 ||  || — || September 25, 2009 || La Sagra || OAM Obs. ||  || align=right | 3.8 km || 
|-id=172 bgcolor=#FA8072
| 499172 ||  || — || September 25, 2009 || La Sagra || OAM Obs. || H || align=right data-sort-value="0.73" | 730 m || 
|-id=173 bgcolor=#E9E9E9
| 499173 ||  || — || September 18, 2009 || Kitt Peak || Spacewatch ||  || align=right data-sort-value="0.44" | 440 m || 
|-id=174 bgcolor=#E9E9E9
| 499174 ||  || — || September 18, 2009 || Kitt Peak || Spacewatch ||  || align=right | 1.6 km || 
|-id=175 bgcolor=#E9E9E9
| 499175 ||  || — || September 18, 2009 || Kitt Peak || Spacewatch || KON || align=right | 1.8 km || 
|-id=176 bgcolor=#E9E9E9
| 499176 ||  || — || September 30, 2005 || Mount Lemmon || Mount Lemmon Survey ||  || align=right data-sort-value="0.69" | 690 m || 
|-id=177 bgcolor=#fefefe
| 499177 ||  || — || September 22, 2009 || Kitt Peak || Spacewatch || H || align=right data-sort-value="0.87" | 870 m || 
|-id=178 bgcolor=#E9E9E9
| 499178 ||  || — || September 21, 2009 || Kitt Peak || Spacewatch ||  || align=right data-sort-value="0.68" | 680 m || 
|-id=179 bgcolor=#E9E9E9
| 499179 ||  || — || September 21, 2009 || Kitt Peak || Spacewatch ||  || align=right data-sort-value="0.59" | 590 m || 
|-id=180 bgcolor=#E9E9E9
| 499180 ||  || — || September 22, 2009 || Kitt Peak || Spacewatch ||  || align=right data-sort-value="0.71" | 710 m || 
|-id=181 bgcolor=#E9E9E9
| 499181 ||  || — || October 29, 2005 || Kitt Peak || Spacewatch || RAF || align=right data-sort-value="0.60" | 600 m || 
|-id=182 bgcolor=#E9E9E9
| 499182 ||  || — || September 15, 2009 || Kitt Peak || Spacewatch ||  || align=right | 1.5 km || 
|-id=183 bgcolor=#E9E9E9
| 499183 ||  || — || September 23, 2009 || Mount Lemmon || Mount Lemmon Survey ||  || align=right data-sort-value="0.74" | 740 m || 
|-id=184 bgcolor=#E9E9E9
| 499184 ||  || — || September 22, 2009 || Kitt Peak || Spacewatch || ADE || align=right | 1.7 km || 
|-id=185 bgcolor=#E9E9E9
| 499185 ||  || — || September 19, 2009 || Kitt Peak || Spacewatch ||  || align=right data-sort-value="0.60" | 600 m || 
|-id=186 bgcolor=#E9E9E9
| 499186 ||  || — || September 17, 2009 || Kitt Peak || Spacewatch ||  || align=right data-sort-value="0.81" | 810 m || 
|-id=187 bgcolor=#E9E9E9
| 499187 ||  || — || August 27, 2009 || Kitt Peak || Spacewatch ||  || align=right | 1.4 km || 
|-id=188 bgcolor=#E9E9E9
| 499188 ||  || — || September 18, 2009 || Kitt Peak || Spacewatch ||  || align=right | 1.2 km || 
|-id=189 bgcolor=#E9E9E9
| 499189 ||  || — || November 4, 2005 || Kitt Peak || Spacewatch ||  || align=right | 1.3 km || 
|-id=190 bgcolor=#E9E9E9
| 499190 ||  || — || September 30, 2009 || Mount Lemmon || Mount Lemmon Survey ||  || align=right | 1.9 km || 
|-id=191 bgcolor=#E9E9E9
| 499191 ||  || — || September 28, 2009 || Mount Lemmon || Mount Lemmon Survey ||  || align=right data-sort-value="0.76" | 760 m || 
|-id=192 bgcolor=#E9E9E9
| 499192 ||  || — || September 27, 2009 || Catalina || CSS ||  || align=right | 1.3 km || 
|-id=193 bgcolor=#E9E9E9
| 499193 ||  || — || September 16, 2009 || Kitt Peak || Spacewatch ||  || align=right data-sort-value="0.79" | 790 m || 
|-id=194 bgcolor=#fefefe
| 499194 ||  || — || September 20, 2009 || Mount Lemmon || Mount Lemmon Survey || H || align=right data-sort-value="0.45" | 450 m || 
|-id=195 bgcolor=#E9E9E9
| 499195 ||  || — || September 30, 2009 || Mount Lemmon || Mount Lemmon Survey ||  || align=right data-sort-value="0.58" | 580 m || 
|-id=196 bgcolor=#FA8072
| 499196 ||  || — || September 20, 2009 || Socorro || LINEAR || H || align=right data-sort-value="0.74" | 740 m || 
|-id=197 bgcolor=#E9E9E9
| 499197 ||  || — || September 18, 2009 || Catalina || CSS ||  || align=right | 1.5 km || 
|-id=198 bgcolor=#E9E9E9
| 499198 ||  || — || September 28, 2009 || Catalina || CSS || EUN || align=right | 1.1 km || 
|-id=199 bgcolor=#E9E9E9
| 499199 ||  || — || September 16, 2009 || Kitt Peak || Spacewatch ||  || align=right data-sort-value="0.70" | 700 m || 
|-id=200 bgcolor=#E9E9E9
| 499200 ||  || — || October 11, 2009 || Mount Lemmon || Mount Lemmon Survey ||  || align=right | 1.2 km || 
|}

499201–499300 

|-bgcolor=#fefefe
| 499201 ||  || — || September 22, 2009 || Kitt Peak || Spacewatch || H || align=right data-sort-value="0.48" | 480 m || 
|-id=202 bgcolor=#E9E9E9
| 499202 ||  || — || October 1, 2005 || Kitt Peak || Spacewatch ||  || align=right | 1.1 km || 
|-id=203 bgcolor=#E9E9E9
| 499203 ||  || — || October 15, 2009 || La Sagra || OAM Obs. ||  || align=right | 1.3 km || 
|-id=204 bgcolor=#E9E9E9
| 499204 ||  || — || September 25, 2009 || Catalina || CSS || ADE || align=right | 2.7 km || 
|-id=205 bgcolor=#E9E9E9
| 499205 ||  || — || October 16, 2009 || Mount Lemmon || Mount Lemmon Survey ||  || align=right data-sort-value="0.73" | 730 m || 
|-id=206 bgcolor=#E9E9E9
| 499206 ||  || — || October 16, 2009 || Mount Lemmon || Mount Lemmon Survey ||  || align=right data-sort-value="0.79" | 790 m || 
|-id=207 bgcolor=#fefefe
| 499207 ||  || — || October 18, 2009 || La Sagra || OAM Obs. || H || align=right data-sort-value="0.60" | 600 m || 
|-id=208 bgcolor=#fefefe
| 499208 ||  || — || September 16, 2009 || Mount Lemmon || Mount Lemmon Survey || H || align=right data-sort-value="0.70" | 700 m || 
|-id=209 bgcolor=#fefefe
| 499209 ||  || — || September 29, 2009 || Mount Lemmon || Mount Lemmon Survey || H || align=right data-sort-value="0.54" | 540 m || 
|-id=210 bgcolor=#E9E9E9
| 499210 ||  || — || September 23, 2009 || Mount Lemmon || Mount Lemmon Survey || EUN || align=right data-sort-value="0.98" | 980 m || 
|-id=211 bgcolor=#E9E9E9
| 499211 ||  || — || September 19, 2009 || Mount Lemmon || Mount Lemmon Survey ||  || align=right | 1.7 km || 
|-id=212 bgcolor=#E9E9E9
| 499212 ||  || — || October 22, 2009 || Mount Lemmon || Mount Lemmon Survey ||  || align=right data-sort-value="0.80" | 800 m || 
|-id=213 bgcolor=#fefefe
| 499213 ||  || — || October 14, 2009 || XuYi || PMO NEO || H || align=right data-sort-value="0.61" | 610 m || 
|-id=214 bgcolor=#E9E9E9
| 499214 ||  || — || October 18, 2009 || Mount Lemmon || Mount Lemmon Survey ||  || align=right data-sort-value="0.65" | 650 m || 
|-id=215 bgcolor=#E9E9E9
| 499215 ||  || — || October 18, 2009 || Mount Lemmon || Mount Lemmon Survey || EUN || align=right | 1.0 km || 
|-id=216 bgcolor=#E9E9E9
| 499216 ||  || — || October 22, 2009 || Mount Lemmon || Mount Lemmon Survey ||  || align=right | 1.0 km || 
|-id=217 bgcolor=#E9E9E9
| 499217 ||  || — || October 30, 2005 || Mount Lemmon || Mount Lemmon Survey ||  || align=right data-sort-value="0.86" | 860 m || 
|-id=218 bgcolor=#E9E9E9
| 499218 ||  || — || October 23, 2009 || Mount Lemmon || Mount Lemmon Survey ||  || align=right data-sort-value="0.67" | 670 m || 
|-id=219 bgcolor=#E9E9E9
| 499219 ||  || — || September 22, 2009 || Mount Lemmon || Mount Lemmon Survey ||  || align=right | 1.3 km || 
|-id=220 bgcolor=#E9E9E9
| 499220 ||  || — || November 12, 2005 || Kitt Peak || Spacewatch ||  || align=right data-sort-value="0.91" | 910 m || 
|-id=221 bgcolor=#E9E9E9
| 499221 ||  || — || September 19, 2009 || Mount Lemmon || Mount Lemmon Survey ||  || align=right | 1.2 km || 
|-id=222 bgcolor=#E9E9E9
| 499222 ||  || — || October 23, 2009 || Mount Lemmon || Mount Lemmon Survey ||  || align=right | 1.3 km || 
|-id=223 bgcolor=#E9E9E9
| 499223 ||  || — || October 18, 2009 || Mount Lemmon || Mount Lemmon Survey || EUN || align=right | 1.0 km || 
|-id=224 bgcolor=#E9E9E9
| 499224 ||  || — || September 22, 2009 || Catalina || CSS ||  || align=right | 1.0 km || 
|-id=225 bgcolor=#E9E9E9
| 499225 ||  || — || October 25, 2009 || Catalina || CSS ||  || align=right data-sort-value="0.81" | 810 m || 
|-id=226 bgcolor=#E9E9E9
| 499226 ||  || — || October 18, 2009 || La Sagra || OAM Obs. ||  || align=right | 1.9 km || 
|-id=227 bgcolor=#C2FFFF
| 499227 ||  || — || October 23, 2009 || Mount Lemmon || Mount Lemmon Survey || L4 || align=right | 7.2 km || 
|-id=228 bgcolor=#E9E9E9
| 499228 ||  || — || October 24, 2009 || Kitt Peak || Spacewatch ||  || align=right data-sort-value="0.77" | 770 m || 
|-id=229 bgcolor=#fefefe
| 499229 ||  || — || September 27, 2009 || Mount Lemmon || Mount Lemmon Survey ||  || align=right | 1.1 km || 
|-id=230 bgcolor=#E9E9E9
| 499230 ||  || — || October 23, 2009 || Kitt Peak || Spacewatch ||  || align=right | 1.1 km || 
|-id=231 bgcolor=#C2FFFF
| 499231 ||  || — || October 25, 2009 || Kitt Peak || Spacewatch || L4 || align=right | 9.1 km || 
|-id=232 bgcolor=#E9E9E9
| 499232 ||  || — || October 25, 2005 || Kitt Peak || Spacewatch ||  || align=right | 1.1 km || 
|-id=233 bgcolor=#E9E9E9
| 499233 ||  || — || October 23, 2009 || Mount Lemmon || Mount Lemmon Survey ||  || align=right data-sort-value="0.55" | 550 m || 
|-id=234 bgcolor=#E9E9E9
| 499234 ||  || — || October 26, 2009 || Mount Lemmon || Mount Lemmon Survey ||  || align=right | 2.1 km || 
|-id=235 bgcolor=#E9E9E9
| 499235 ||  || — || October 26, 2009 || Mount Lemmon || Mount Lemmon Survey ||  || align=right data-sort-value="0.84" | 840 m || 
|-id=236 bgcolor=#fefefe
| 499236 ||  || — || October 16, 2009 || Socorro || LINEAR || H || align=right data-sort-value="0.68" | 680 m || 
|-id=237 bgcolor=#E9E9E9
| 499237 ||  || — || September 19, 2009 || Catalina || CSS ||  || align=right | 1.4 km || 
|-id=238 bgcolor=#E9E9E9
| 499238 ||  || — || October 18, 2001 || Kitt Peak || Spacewatch ||  || align=right data-sort-value="0.52" | 520 m || 
|-id=239 bgcolor=#E9E9E9
| 499239 ||  || — || October 26, 2009 || Kitt Peak || Spacewatch ||  || align=right | 2.0 km || 
|-id=240 bgcolor=#E9E9E9
| 499240 ||  || — || October 27, 2009 || La Sagra || OAM Obs. ||  || align=right | 1.1 km || 
|-id=241 bgcolor=#E9E9E9
| 499241 ||  || — || October 24, 2009 || Kitt Peak || Spacewatch ||  || align=right data-sort-value="0.68" | 680 m || 
|-id=242 bgcolor=#E9E9E9
| 499242 ||  || — || October 16, 2009 || Mount Lemmon || Mount Lemmon Survey ||  || align=right data-sort-value="0.82" | 820 m || 
|-id=243 bgcolor=#E9E9E9
| 499243 ||  || — || October 18, 2009 || Mount Lemmon || Mount Lemmon Survey ||  || align=right data-sort-value="0.64" | 640 m || 
|-id=244 bgcolor=#FA8072
| 499244 ||  || — || October 16, 2009 || Catalina || CSS || H || align=right data-sort-value="0.67" | 670 m || 
|-id=245 bgcolor=#E9E9E9
| 499245 ||  || — || October 18, 2009 || Mount Lemmon || Mount Lemmon Survey ||  || align=right | 1.2 km || 
|-id=246 bgcolor=#E9E9E9
| 499246 ||  || — || October 21, 2009 || Mount Lemmon || Mount Lemmon Survey ||  || align=right | 1.4 km || 
|-id=247 bgcolor=#E9E9E9
| 499247 ||  || — || October 23, 2009 || Mount Lemmon || Mount Lemmon Survey ||  || align=right data-sort-value="0.56" | 560 m || 
|-id=248 bgcolor=#E9E9E9
| 499248 ||  || — || October 24, 2009 || Kitt Peak || Spacewatch ||  || align=right data-sort-value="0.55" | 550 m || 
|-id=249 bgcolor=#E9E9E9
| 499249 ||  || — || October 26, 2009 || Kitt Peak || Spacewatch ||  || align=right data-sort-value="0.67" | 670 m || 
|-id=250 bgcolor=#E9E9E9
| 499250 ||  || — || October 24, 2009 || Socorro || LINEAR ||  || align=right | 1.5 km || 
|-id=251 bgcolor=#E9E9E9
| 499251 ||  || — || November 6, 2009 || Catalina || CSS || BAR || align=right | 2.0 km || 
|-id=252 bgcolor=#E9E9E9
| 499252 ||  || — || November 9, 2009 || Socorro || LINEAR ||  || align=right | 1.6 km || 
|-id=253 bgcolor=#E9E9E9
| 499253 ||  || — || November 8, 2009 || Kitt Peak || Spacewatch ||  || align=right | 1.3 km || 
|-id=254 bgcolor=#E9E9E9
| 499254 ||  || — || November 8, 2009 || Kitt Peak || Spacewatch ||  || align=right data-sort-value="0.47" | 470 m || 
|-id=255 bgcolor=#E9E9E9
| 499255 ||  || — || November 8, 2009 || Kitt Peak || Spacewatch || MIS || align=right | 1.6 km || 
|-id=256 bgcolor=#E9E9E9
| 499256 ||  || — || November 8, 2009 || Kitt Peak || Spacewatch ||  || align=right data-sort-value="0.86" | 860 m || 
|-id=257 bgcolor=#E9E9E9
| 499257 ||  || — || October 24, 2009 || Kitt Peak || Spacewatch ||  || align=right data-sort-value="0.70" | 700 m || 
|-id=258 bgcolor=#E9E9E9
| 499258 ||  || — || October 14, 2009 || Kitt Peak || Spacewatch ||  || align=right | 1.2 km || 
|-id=259 bgcolor=#E9E9E9
| 499259 ||  || — || November 9, 2009 || Mount Lemmon || Mount Lemmon Survey ||  || align=right data-sort-value="0.87" | 870 m || 
|-id=260 bgcolor=#E9E9E9
| 499260 ||  || — || November 22, 2005 || Kitt Peak || Spacewatch ||  || align=right data-sort-value="0.66" | 660 m || 
|-id=261 bgcolor=#E9E9E9
| 499261 ||  || — || October 23, 2009 || Kitt Peak || Spacewatch ||  || align=right | 2.0 km || 
|-id=262 bgcolor=#E9E9E9
| 499262 ||  || — || November 9, 2009 || Kitt Peak || Spacewatch || ADE || align=right | 1.5 km || 
|-id=263 bgcolor=#E9E9E9
| 499263 ||  || — || September 21, 2009 || Mount Lemmon || Mount Lemmon Survey || EUN || align=right | 1.1 km || 
|-id=264 bgcolor=#E9E9E9
| 499264 ||  || — || September 19, 2009 || Mount Lemmon || Mount Lemmon Survey || MAR || align=right data-sort-value="0.96" | 960 m || 
|-id=265 bgcolor=#E9E9E9
| 499265 ||  || — || November 11, 2009 || La Sagra || OAM Obs. || HNS || align=right | 1.7 km || 
|-id=266 bgcolor=#E9E9E9
| 499266 ||  || — || October 30, 2009 || Mount Lemmon || Mount Lemmon Survey ||  || align=right | 1.4 km || 
|-id=267 bgcolor=#E9E9E9
| 499267 ||  || — || November 9, 2009 || Mount Lemmon || Mount Lemmon Survey ||  || align=right data-sort-value="0.72" | 720 m || 
|-id=268 bgcolor=#E9E9E9
| 499268 ||  || — || November 9, 2009 || Mount Lemmon || Mount Lemmon Survey ||  || align=right | 1.2 km || 
|-id=269 bgcolor=#E9E9E9
| 499269 ||  || — || August 28, 2009 || Kitt Peak || Spacewatch ||  || align=right | 1.2 km || 
|-id=270 bgcolor=#E9E9E9
| 499270 ||  || — || October 23, 2009 || Mount Lemmon || Mount Lemmon Survey ||  || align=right | 1.8 km || 
|-id=271 bgcolor=#E9E9E9
| 499271 ||  || — || October 23, 2009 || Mount Lemmon || Mount Lemmon Survey ||  || align=right | 2.8 km || 
|-id=272 bgcolor=#E9E9E9
| 499272 ||  || — || October 27, 2009 || Kitt Peak || Spacewatch ||  || align=right data-sort-value="0.82" | 820 m || 
|-id=273 bgcolor=#E9E9E9
| 499273 ||  || — || November 8, 2009 || Kitt Peak || Spacewatch ||  || align=right data-sort-value="0.82" | 820 m || 
|-id=274 bgcolor=#E9E9E9
| 499274 ||  || — || November 8, 2009 || Kitt Peak || Spacewatch ||  || align=right | 1.8 km || 
|-id=275 bgcolor=#E9E9E9
| 499275 ||  || — || October 22, 2009 || Mount Lemmon || Mount Lemmon Survey ||  || align=right | 1.0 km || 
|-id=276 bgcolor=#E9E9E9
| 499276 ||  || — || November 9, 2009 || Kitt Peak || Spacewatch ||  || align=right | 1.7 km || 
|-id=277 bgcolor=#E9E9E9
| 499277 ||  || — || December 29, 2005 || Kitt Peak || Spacewatch ||  || align=right | 1.1 km || 
|-id=278 bgcolor=#E9E9E9
| 499278 ||  || — || November 9, 2009 || Kitt Peak || Spacewatch ||  || align=right | 1.3 km || 
|-id=279 bgcolor=#E9E9E9
| 499279 ||  || — || November 9, 2009 || Kitt Peak || Spacewatch ||  || align=right | 2.1 km || 
|-id=280 bgcolor=#E9E9E9
| 499280 ||  || — || November 14, 2009 || Socorro || LINEAR ||  || align=right data-sort-value="0.85" | 850 m || 
|-id=281 bgcolor=#E9E9E9
| 499281 ||  || — || November 13, 2009 || La Sagra || OAM Obs. ||  || align=right | 1.0 km || 
|-id=282 bgcolor=#E9E9E9
| 499282 ||  || — || October 28, 2009 || La Sagra || OAM Obs. ||  || align=right | 1.4 km || 
|-id=283 bgcolor=#E9E9E9
| 499283 ||  || — || November 10, 2009 || Catalina || CSS ||  || align=right | 1.2 km || 
|-id=284 bgcolor=#E9E9E9
| 499284 ||  || — || September 19, 2009 || Mount Lemmon || Mount Lemmon Survey || ADE || align=right | 2.5 km || 
|-id=285 bgcolor=#E9E9E9
| 499285 ||  || — || October 24, 2009 || Catalina || CSS ||  || align=right | 1.4 km || 
|-id=286 bgcolor=#E9E9E9
| 499286 ||  || — || October 16, 2009 || Mount Lemmon || Mount Lemmon Survey ||  || align=right data-sort-value="0.94" | 940 m || 
|-id=287 bgcolor=#E9E9E9
| 499287 ||  || — || November 29, 2005 || Mount Lemmon || Mount Lemmon Survey ||  || align=right | 2.2 km || 
|-id=288 bgcolor=#E9E9E9
| 499288 ||  || — || November 9, 2009 || Kitt Peak || Spacewatch ||  || align=right | 1.7 km || 
|-id=289 bgcolor=#E9E9E9
| 499289 ||  || — || November 9, 2009 || Kitt Peak || Spacewatch ||  || align=right | 2.7 km || 
|-id=290 bgcolor=#E9E9E9
| 499290 ||  || — || November 10, 2009 || Kitt Peak || Spacewatch || EUN || align=right | 1.8 km || 
|-id=291 bgcolor=#E9E9E9
| 499291 ||  || — || January 8, 2002 || Socorro || LINEAR ||  || align=right data-sort-value="0.84" | 840 m || 
|-id=292 bgcolor=#E9E9E9
| 499292 ||  || — || November 16, 2009 || La Sagra || OAM Obs. ||  || align=right | 1.2 km || 
|-id=293 bgcolor=#E9E9E9
| 499293 ||  || — || October 16, 2009 || Mount Lemmon || Mount Lemmon Survey ||  || align=right data-sort-value="0.98" | 980 m || 
|-id=294 bgcolor=#E9E9E9
| 499294 ||  || — || November 8, 2009 || Mount Lemmon || Mount Lemmon Survey ||  || align=right | 1.8 km || 
|-id=295 bgcolor=#E9E9E9
| 499295 ||  || — || October 30, 2009 || Mount Lemmon || Mount Lemmon Survey ||  || align=right | 1.7 km || 
|-id=296 bgcolor=#E9E9E9
| 499296 ||  || — || October 15, 2009 || Socorro || LINEAR ||  || align=right | 1.4 km || 
|-id=297 bgcolor=#E9E9E9
| 499297 ||  || — || November 19, 2009 || Kitt Peak || Spacewatch || WIT || align=right | 1.8 km || 
|-id=298 bgcolor=#E9E9E9
| 499298 ||  || — || November 16, 2009 || Mount Lemmon || Mount Lemmon Survey ||  || align=right | 1.4 km || 
|-id=299 bgcolor=#E9E9E9
| 499299 ||  || — || November 16, 2009 || Mount Lemmon || Mount Lemmon Survey || AGN || align=right | 1.2 km || 
|-id=300 bgcolor=#E9E9E9
| 499300 ||  || — || November 17, 2009 || Mount Lemmon || Mount Lemmon Survey ||  || align=right | 1.9 km || 
|}

499301–499400 

|-bgcolor=#E9E9E9
| 499301 ||  || — || October 26, 2009 || Kitt Peak || Spacewatch ||  || align=right | 1.9 km || 
|-id=302 bgcolor=#E9E9E9
| 499302 ||  || — || November 22, 2009 || Mayhill || A. Lowe ||  || align=right data-sort-value="0.70" | 700 m || 
|-id=303 bgcolor=#E9E9E9
| 499303 ||  || — || November 16, 2009 || Kitt Peak || Spacewatch ||  || align=right data-sort-value="0.96" | 960 m || 
|-id=304 bgcolor=#E9E9E9
| 499304 ||  || — || November 16, 2009 || Kitt Peak || Spacewatch ||  || align=right | 1.4 km || 
|-id=305 bgcolor=#E9E9E9
| 499305 ||  || — || September 21, 2009 || Mount Lemmon || Mount Lemmon Survey ||  || align=right data-sort-value="0.67" | 670 m || 
|-id=306 bgcolor=#E9E9E9
| 499306 ||  || — || November 17, 2009 || Kitt Peak || Spacewatch ||  || align=right | 1.7 km || 
|-id=307 bgcolor=#FFC2E0
| 499307 ||  || — || November 22, 2009 || Catalina || CSS || AMO || align=right data-sort-value="0.64" | 640 m || 
|-id=308 bgcolor=#E9E9E9
| 499308 ||  || — || October 18, 2009 || Socorro || LINEAR ||  || align=right | 1.6 km || 
|-id=309 bgcolor=#E9E9E9
| 499309 ||  || — || October 12, 2009 || Mount Lemmon || Mount Lemmon Survey ||  || align=right | 1.5 km || 
|-id=310 bgcolor=#E9E9E9
| 499310 ||  || — || November 10, 2009 || Kitt Peak || Spacewatch ||  || align=right | 2.1 km || 
|-id=311 bgcolor=#E9E9E9
| 499311 ||  || — || November 18, 2009 || Kitt Peak || Spacewatch ||  || align=right data-sort-value="0.63" | 630 m || 
|-id=312 bgcolor=#E9E9E9
| 499312 ||  || — || November 18, 2009 || Kitt Peak || Spacewatch ||  || align=right data-sort-value="0.94" | 940 m || 
|-id=313 bgcolor=#E9E9E9
| 499313 ||  || — || November 18, 2009 || Kitt Peak || Spacewatch ||  || align=right | 1.1 km || 
|-id=314 bgcolor=#E9E9E9
| 499314 ||  || — || November 19, 2009 || Kitt Peak || Spacewatch ||  || align=right data-sort-value="0.75" | 750 m || 
|-id=315 bgcolor=#E9E9E9
| 499315 ||  || — || November 19, 2009 || Kitt Peak || Spacewatch ||  || align=right | 2.1 km || 
|-id=316 bgcolor=#E9E9E9
| 499316 ||  || — || September 20, 2009 || Mount Lemmon || Mount Lemmon Survey ||  || align=right data-sort-value="0.68" | 680 m || 
|-id=317 bgcolor=#E9E9E9
| 499317 ||  || — || November 22, 2009 || Catalina || CSS ||  || align=right data-sort-value="0.94" | 940 m || 
|-id=318 bgcolor=#E9E9E9
| 499318 ||  || — || November 20, 2009 || Kitt Peak || Spacewatch ||  || align=right data-sort-value="0.70" | 700 m || 
|-id=319 bgcolor=#d6d6d6
| 499319 ||  || — || November 20, 2009 || Kitt Peak || Spacewatch || EOS || align=right | 1.6 km || 
|-id=320 bgcolor=#E9E9E9
| 499320 ||  || — || November 20, 2009 || Kitt Peak || Spacewatch || MIS || align=right | 2.2 km || 
|-id=321 bgcolor=#E9E9E9
| 499321 ||  || — || October 27, 2009 || Mount Lemmon || Mount Lemmon Survey ||  || align=right | 2.4 km || 
|-id=322 bgcolor=#E9E9E9
| 499322 ||  || — || November 22, 2009 || Catalina || CSS ||  || align=right data-sort-value="0.71" | 710 m || 
|-id=323 bgcolor=#E9E9E9
| 499323 ||  || — || November 19, 2009 || Kitt Peak || Spacewatch || ADE || align=right | 2.8 km || 
|-id=324 bgcolor=#E9E9E9
| 499324 ||  || — || November 19, 2009 || Mount Lemmon || Mount Lemmon Survey || ADE || align=right data-sort-value="0.79" | 790 m || 
|-id=325 bgcolor=#E9E9E9
| 499325 ||  || — || September 22, 2009 || Mount Lemmon || Mount Lemmon Survey ||  || align=right data-sort-value="0.82" | 820 m || 
|-id=326 bgcolor=#E9E9E9
| 499326 ||  || — || November 19, 2009 || Mount Lemmon || Mount Lemmon Survey ||  || align=right data-sort-value="0.94" | 940 m || 
|-id=327 bgcolor=#E9E9E9
| 499327 ||  || — || November 19, 2009 || Mount Lemmon || Mount Lemmon Survey ||  || align=right | 1.2 km || 
|-id=328 bgcolor=#E9E9E9
| 499328 ||  || — || December 22, 2005 || Catalina || CSS ||  || align=right data-sort-value="0.82" | 820 m || 
|-id=329 bgcolor=#d6d6d6
| 499329 ||  || — || November 9, 2009 || Kitt Peak || Spacewatch ||  || align=right | 2.9 km || 
|-id=330 bgcolor=#E9E9E9
| 499330 ||  || — || November 9, 2009 || Mount Lemmon || Mount Lemmon Survey ||  || align=right | 1.0 km || 
|-id=331 bgcolor=#E9E9E9
| 499331 ||  || — || November 11, 2009 || Kitt Peak || Spacewatch ||  || align=right | 2.7 km || 
|-id=332 bgcolor=#E9E9E9
| 499332 ||  || — || October 23, 2009 || Mount Lemmon || Mount Lemmon Survey ||  || align=right | 1.4 km || 
|-id=333 bgcolor=#E9E9E9
| 499333 ||  || — || October 26, 2009 || Mount Lemmon || Mount Lemmon Survey ||  || align=right data-sort-value="0.98" | 980 m || 
|-id=334 bgcolor=#E9E9E9
| 499334 ||  || — || November 26, 2009 || Mount Lemmon || Mount Lemmon Survey ||  || align=right data-sort-value="0.80" | 800 m || 
|-id=335 bgcolor=#E9E9E9
| 499335 ||  || — || November 26, 2009 || Mount Lemmon || Mount Lemmon Survey ||  || align=right | 1.6 km || 
|-id=336 bgcolor=#E9E9E9
| 499336 ||  || — || November 17, 2009 || Kitt Peak || Spacewatch ||  || align=right data-sort-value="0.81" | 810 m || 
|-id=337 bgcolor=#E9E9E9
| 499337 ||  || — || November 9, 2009 || Kitt Peak || Spacewatch ||  || align=right | 1.9 km || 
|-id=338 bgcolor=#E9E9E9
| 499338 ||  || — || November 8, 2009 || Catalina || CSS ||  || align=right | 1.5 km || 
|-id=339 bgcolor=#E9E9E9
| 499339 ||  || — || November 18, 2009 || Kitt Peak || Spacewatch || EUN || align=right | 1.6 km || 
|-id=340 bgcolor=#E9E9E9
| 499340 ||  || — || November 8, 2009 || Kitt Peak || Spacewatch || WIT || align=right | 1.5 km || 
|-id=341 bgcolor=#E9E9E9
| 499341 ||  || — || November 17, 2009 || Kitt Peak || Spacewatch ||  || align=right | 2.0 km || 
|-id=342 bgcolor=#E9E9E9
| 499342 ||  || — || December 25, 2005 || Kitt Peak || Spacewatch ||  || align=right | 1.1 km || 
|-id=343 bgcolor=#E9E9E9
| 499343 ||  || — || November 8, 2009 || Kitt Peak || Spacewatch ||  || align=right | 1.6 km || 
|-id=344 bgcolor=#E9E9E9
| 499344 ||  || — || November 16, 2009 || Mount Lemmon || Mount Lemmon Survey ||  || align=right | 2.3 km || 
|-id=345 bgcolor=#E9E9E9
| 499345 ||  || — || November 19, 2009 || Kitt Peak || Spacewatch ||  || align=right | 1.3 km || 
|-id=346 bgcolor=#E9E9E9
| 499346 ||  || — || November 20, 2009 || Mount Lemmon || Mount Lemmon Survey ||  || align=right data-sort-value="0.89" | 890 m || 
|-id=347 bgcolor=#fefefe
| 499347 ||  || — || November 26, 2009 || Catalina || CSS || H || align=right data-sort-value="0.94" | 940 m || 
|-id=348 bgcolor=#E9E9E9
| 499348 ||  || — || November 25, 2009 || Kitt Peak || Spacewatch ||  || align=right data-sort-value="0.89" | 890 m || 
|-id=349 bgcolor=#E9E9E9
| 499349 ||  || — || November 17, 2009 || Kitt Peak || Spacewatch ||  || align=right | 2.7 km || 
|-id=350 bgcolor=#E9E9E9
| 499350 ||  || — || November 17, 2009 || Kitt Peak || Spacewatch ||  || align=right | 1.3 km || 
|-id=351 bgcolor=#E9E9E9
| 499351 ||  || — || November 26, 2009 || Kitt Peak || Spacewatch ||  || align=right | 2.6 km || 
|-id=352 bgcolor=#E9E9E9
| 499352 ||  || — || November 16, 2009 || Socorro || LINEAR ||  || align=right data-sort-value="0.96" | 960 m || 
|-id=353 bgcolor=#E9E9E9
| 499353 ||  || — || February 2, 2006 || Mount Lemmon || Mount Lemmon Survey ||  || align=right | 2.7 km || 
|-id=354 bgcolor=#E9E9E9
| 499354 ||  || — || November 17, 2009 || Mount Lemmon || Mount Lemmon Survey ||  || align=right | 1.4 km || 
|-id=355 bgcolor=#d6d6d6
| 499355 ||  || — || October 26, 2009 || Mount Lemmon || Mount Lemmon Survey ||  || align=right | 2.6 km || 
|-id=356 bgcolor=#E9E9E9
| 499356 ||  || — || November 21, 2009 || Mount Lemmon || Mount Lemmon Survey ||  || align=right | 1.7 km || 
|-id=357 bgcolor=#E9E9E9
| 499357 ||  || — || November 11, 2009 || Mount Lemmon || Mount Lemmon Survey ||  || align=right | 2.6 km || 
|-id=358 bgcolor=#E9E9E9
| 499358 ||  || — || December 15, 2009 || Mount Lemmon || Mount Lemmon Survey ||  || align=right | 1.8 km || 
|-id=359 bgcolor=#E9E9E9
| 499359 ||  || — || November 21, 2009 || Kitt Peak || Spacewatch ||  || align=right | 2.5 km || 
|-id=360 bgcolor=#E9E9E9
| 499360 ||  || — || October 27, 2009 || Mount Lemmon || Mount Lemmon Survey ||  || align=right | 1.9 km || 
|-id=361 bgcolor=#E9E9E9
| 499361 ||  || — || December 17, 2009 || Mount Lemmon || Mount Lemmon Survey ||  || align=right | 1.5 km || 
|-id=362 bgcolor=#E9E9E9
| 499362 ||  || — || December 16, 2009 || Kitt Peak || Spacewatch ||  || align=right | 1.8 km || 
|-id=363 bgcolor=#E9E9E9
| 499363 ||  || — || December 9, 2009 || La Sagra || OAM Obs. || EUN || align=right | 1.6 km || 
|-id=364 bgcolor=#E9E9E9
| 499364 ||  || — || November 17, 2009 || Mount Lemmon || Mount Lemmon Survey ||  || align=right data-sort-value="0.90" | 900 m || 
|-id=365 bgcolor=#E9E9E9
| 499365 ||  || — || December 26, 2009 || Kitt Peak || Spacewatch ||  || align=right | 1.6 km || 
|-id=366 bgcolor=#E9E9E9
| 499366 ||  || — || December 19, 2009 || Mount Lemmon || Mount Lemmon Survey ||  || align=right | 1.0 km || 
|-id=367 bgcolor=#E9E9E9
| 499367 ||  || — || January 5, 2010 || Sierra Stars || Sierra Stars Obs. ||  || align=right data-sort-value="0.79" | 790 m || 
|-id=368 bgcolor=#E9E9E9
| 499368 ||  || — || January 4, 2010 || Kitt Peak || Spacewatch ||  || align=right | 1.5 km || 
|-id=369 bgcolor=#E9E9E9
| 499369 ||  || — || December 20, 2009 || Kitt Peak || Spacewatch ||  || align=right | 2.4 km || 
|-id=370 bgcolor=#E9E9E9
| 499370 ||  || — || December 19, 2009 || Mount Lemmon || Mount Lemmon Survey ||  || align=right | 2.7 km || 
|-id=371 bgcolor=#E9E9E9
| 499371 ||  || — || January 6, 2010 || Kitt Peak || Spacewatch || JUN || align=right | 1.1 km || 
|-id=372 bgcolor=#E9E9E9
| 499372 ||  || — || January 6, 2010 || Kitt Peak || Spacewatch ||  || align=right | 1.2 km || 
|-id=373 bgcolor=#E9E9E9
| 499373 ||  || — || January 6, 2010 || Kitt Peak || Spacewatch ||  || align=right | 2.5 km || 
|-id=374 bgcolor=#fefefe
| 499374 ||  || — || December 20, 2009 || Kitt Peak || Spacewatch || H || align=right data-sort-value="0.86" | 860 m || 
|-id=375 bgcolor=#E9E9E9
| 499375 ||  || — || December 17, 2009 || Kitt Peak || Spacewatch ||  || align=right | 2.0 km || 
|-id=376 bgcolor=#E9E9E9
| 499376 ||  || — || January 8, 2010 || Kitt Peak || Spacewatch ||  || align=right | 1.9 km || 
|-id=377 bgcolor=#E9E9E9
| 499377 ||  || — || January 8, 2010 || Kitt Peak || Spacewatch ||  || align=right | 2.6 km || 
|-id=378 bgcolor=#E9E9E9
| 499378 ||  || — || January 11, 2010 || Kitt Peak || Spacewatch ||  || align=right | 2.7 km || 
|-id=379 bgcolor=#E9E9E9
| 499379 ||  || — || January 11, 2010 || Kitt Peak || Spacewatch ||  || align=right | 2.8 km || 
|-id=380 bgcolor=#E9E9E9
| 499380 ||  || — || January 12, 2010 || Mount Lemmon || Mount Lemmon Survey || BRU || align=right | 3.0 km || 
|-id=381 bgcolor=#E9E9E9
| 499381 ||  || — || November 19, 1995 || Kitt Peak || Spacewatch || AEO || align=right | 1.7 km || 
|-id=382 bgcolor=#E9E9E9
| 499382 ||  || — || October 14, 2009 || Mount Lemmon || Mount Lemmon Survey ||  || align=right | 2.3 km || 
|-id=383 bgcolor=#E9E9E9
| 499383 ||  || — || December 20, 2009 || Kitt Peak || Spacewatch ||  || align=right data-sort-value="0.88" | 880 m || 
|-id=384 bgcolor=#E9E9E9
| 499384 ||  || — || January 13, 2010 || Socorro || LINEAR ||  || align=right | 1.2 km || 
|-id=385 bgcolor=#E9E9E9
| 499385 ||  || — || January 7, 2010 || Catalina || CSS ||  || align=right | 2.9 km || 
|-id=386 bgcolor=#E9E9E9
| 499386 ||  || — || January 5, 2010 || Kitt Peak || Spacewatch ||  || align=right | 2.0 km || 
|-id=387 bgcolor=#d6d6d6
| 499387 ||  || — || January 8, 2010 || WISE || WISE ||  || align=right | 3.2 km || 
|-id=388 bgcolor=#d6d6d6
| 499388 ||  || — || January 8, 2010 || WISE || WISE ||  || align=right | 3.1 km || 
|-id=389 bgcolor=#d6d6d6
| 499389 ||  || — || February 12, 2004 || Kitt Peak || Spacewatch || ALA || align=right | 5.0 km || 
|-id=390 bgcolor=#d6d6d6
| 499390 ||  || — || January 8, 2010 || WISE || WISE ||  || align=right | 3.6 km || 
|-id=391 bgcolor=#d6d6d6
| 499391 ||  || — || January 15, 2010 || WISE || WISE ||  || align=right | 5.3 km || 
|-id=392 bgcolor=#d6d6d6
| 499392 ||  || — || December 26, 2009 || Kitt Peak || Spacewatch || EUP || align=right | 4.3 km || 
|-id=393 bgcolor=#E9E9E9
| 499393 ||  || — || January 6, 2010 || Catalina || CSS ||  || align=right | 1.4 km || 
|-id=394 bgcolor=#E9E9E9
| 499394 ||  || — || November 21, 2009 || Mount Lemmon || Mount Lemmon Survey ||  || align=right data-sort-value="0.83" | 830 m || 
|-id=395 bgcolor=#d6d6d6
| 499395 ||  || — || January 16, 2010 || WISE || WISE || LUT || align=right | 3.5 km || 
|-id=396 bgcolor=#d6d6d6
| 499396 ||  || — || January 18, 2010 || WISE || WISE || EUP || align=right | 3.2 km || 
|-id=397 bgcolor=#d6d6d6
| 499397 ||  || — || January 18, 2010 || WISE || WISE ||  || align=right | 3.8 km || 
|-id=398 bgcolor=#d6d6d6
| 499398 ||  || — || January 20, 2010 || WISE || WISE ||  || align=right | 5.4 km || 
|-id=399 bgcolor=#E9E9E9
| 499399 ||  || — || September 28, 2009 || Mount Lemmon || Mount Lemmon Survey ||  || align=right | 1.3 km || 
|-id=400 bgcolor=#d6d6d6
| 499400 ||  || — || January 21, 2010 || WISE || WISE ||  || align=right | 2.5 km || 
|}

499401–499500 

|-bgcolor=#d6d6d6
| 499401 ||  || — || January 23, 2010 || WISE || WISE || URS || align=right | 3.2 km || 
|-id=402 bgcolor=#d6d6d6
| 499402 ||  || — || January 23, 2010 || WISE || WISE ||  || align=right | 4.4 km || 
|-id=403 bgcolor=#d6d6d6
| 499403 ||  || — || February 16, 2004 || Kitt Peak || Spacewatch ||  || align=right | 3.2 km || 
|-id=404 bgcolor=#d6d6d6
| 499404 ||  || — || January 25, 2010 || WISE || WISE ||  || align=right | 3.9 km || 
|-id=405 bgcolor=#d6d6d6
| 499405 ||  || — || January 26, 2010 || WISE || WISE ||  || align=right | 4.3 km || 
|-id=406 bgcolor=#d6d6d6
| 499406 ||  || — || January 27, 2010 || WISE || WISE || EUP || align=right | 3.5 km || 
|-id=407 bgcolor=#d6d6d6
| 499407 ||  || — || January 31, 2010 || WISE || WISE || EUP || align=right | 4.2 km || 
|-id=408 bgcolor=#d6d6d6
| 499408 ||  || — || February 5, 2010 || Kitt Peak || Spacewatch ||  || align=right | 2.2 km || 
|-id=409 bgcolor=#d6d6d6
| 499409 ||  || — || February 8, 2010 || WISE || WISE ||  || align=right | 3.1 km || 
|-id=410 bgcolor=#E9E9E9
| 499410 ||  || — || January 15, 2010 || Kitt Peak || Spacewatch ||  || align=right | 1.2 km || 
|-id=411 bgcolor=#d6d6d6
| 499411 ||  || — || January 11, 2010 || Kitt Peak || Spacewatch || Tj (2.97) || align=right | 2.9 km || 
|-id=412 bgcolor=#d6d6d6
| 499412 ||  || — || February 9, 2010 || Kitt Peak || Spacewatch ||  || align=right | 2.9 km || 
|-id=413 bgcolor=#d6d6d6
| 499413 ||  || — || February 10, 2010 || Kitt Peak || Spacewatch || EUP || align=right | 3.6 km || 
|-id=414 bgcolor=#d6d6d6
| 499414 ||  || — || January 8, 2010 || Mount Lemmon || Mount Lemmon Survey || EUP || align=right | 2.9 km || 
|-id=415 bgcolor=#E9E9E9
| 499415 ||  || — || February 6, 2010 || La Sagra || OAM Obs. ||  || align=right | 1.7 km || 
|-id=416 bgcolor=#E9E9E9
| 499416 ||  || — || September 24, 2008 || Mount Lemmon || Mount Lemmon Survey ||  || align=right | 2.6 km || 
|-id=417 bgcolor=#E9E9E9
| 499417 ||  || — || February 14, 2010 || Socorro || LINEAR || BAR || align=right | 1.4 km || 
|-id=418 bgcolor=#E9E9E9
| 499418 ||  || — || February 13, 2010 || Socorro || LINEAR ||  || align=right | 2.6 km || 
|-id=419 bgcolor=#d6d6d6
| 499419 ||  || — || February 9, 2010 || Kitt Peak || Spacewatch ||  || align=right | 3.2 km || 
|-id=420 bgcolor=#E9E9E9
| 499420 ||  || — || February 13, 2010 || Mount Lemmon || Mount Lemmon Survey || ADE || align=right | 2.7 km || 
|-id=421 bgcolor=#E9E9E9
| 499421 ||  || — || February 17, 2001 || Kitt Peak || Spacewatch ||  || align=right | 1.3 km || 
|-id=422 bgcolor=#E9E9E9
| 499422 ||  || — || February 13, 2010 || Kitt Peak || Spacewatch ||  || align=right | 2.1 km || 
|-id=423 bgcolor=#d6d6d6
| 499423 ||  || — || February 14, 2010 || Kitt Peak || Spacewatch ||  || align=right | 3.5 km || 
|-id=424 bgcolor=#d6d6d6
| 499424 ||  || — || May 6, 2006 || Kitt Peak || Spacewatch || KOR || align=right | 1.2 km || 
|-id=425 bgcolor=#d6d6d6
| 499425 ||  || — || February 14, 2010 || Mount Lemmon || Mount Lemmon Survey ||  || align=right | 1.9 km || 
|-id=426 bgcolor=#E9E9E9
| 499426 ||  || — || November 17, 2009 || Kitt Peak || Spacewatch ||  || align=right | 1.6 km || 
|-id=427 bgcolor=#d6d6d6
| 499427 ||  || — || February 15, 2010 || Mount Lemmon || Mount Lemmon Survey ||  || align=right | 2.5 km || 
|-id=428 bgcolor=#E9E9E9
| 499428 ||  || — || February 10, 2010 || Kitt Peak || Spacewatch ||  || align=right | 2.2 km || 
|-id=429 bgcolor=#d6d6d6
| 499429 ||  || — || February 9, 2010 || Kitt Peak || Spacewatch ||  || align=right | 3.7 km || 
|-id=430 bgcolor=#d6d6d6
| 499430 ||  || — || February 9, 2010 || Kitt Peak || Spacewatch ||  || align=right | 2.1 km || 
|-id=431 bgcolor=#d6d6d6
| 499431 ||  || — || February 9, 2010 || Kitt Peak || Spacewatch ||  || align=right | 2.6 km || 
|-id=432 bgcolor=#d6d6d6
| 499432 ||  || — || February 10, 2010 || Kitt Peak || Spacewatch ||  || align=right | 2.4 km || 
|-id=433 bgcolor=#E9E9E9
| 499433 ||  || — || January 12, 2010 || Catalina || CSS ||  || align=right | 1.4 km || 
|-id=434 bgcolor=#d6d6d6
| 499434 ||  || — || February 14, 2010 || Haleakala || Pan-STARRS ||  || align=right | 3.2 km || 
|-id=435 bgcolor=#E9E9E9
| 499435 ||  || — || February 12, 2010 || Socorro || LINEAR ||  || align=right | 2.1 km || 
|-id=436 bgcolor=#d6d6d6
| 499436 ||  || — || February 4, 2010 || WISE || WISE || EMA || align=right | 4.3 km || 
|-id=437 bgcolor=#E9E9E9
| 499437 ||  || — || October 11, 2004 || Kitt Peak || Spacewatch || DOR || align=right | 2.3 km || 
|-id=438 bgcolor=#d6d6d6
| 499438 ||  || — || February 3, 2010 || WISE || WISE ||  || align=right | 4.1 km || 
|-id=439 bgcolor=#E9E9E9
| 499439 ||  || — || November 11, 2005 || Kitt Peak || Spacewatch ||  || align=right | 1.6 km || 
|-id=440 bgcolor=#d6d6d6
| 499440 ||  || — || February 18, 2010 || WISE || WISE || EUP || align=right | 3.9 km || 
|-id=441 bgcolor=#d6d6d6
| 499441 ||  || — || February 16, 2010 || Kitt Peak || Spacewatch || TRE || align=right | 3.2 km || 
|-id=442 bgcolor=#FA8072
| 499442 ||  || — || February 20, 2010 || Siding Spring || SSS ||  || align=right data-sort-value="0.49" | 490 m || 
|-id=443 bgcolor=#d6d6d6
| 499443 ||  || — || March 3, 2010 || WISE || WISE || EUP || align=right | 4.1 km || 
|-id=444 bgcolor=#E9E9E9
| 499444 ||  || — || March 11, 2010 || WISE || WISE ||  || align=right | 2.1 km || 
|-id=445 bgcolor=#E9E9E9
| 499445 ||  || — || March 11, 2010 || La Sagra || OAM Obs. ||  || align=right | 2.6 km || 
|-id=446 bgcolor=#d6d6d6
| 499446 ||  || — || December 18, 2009 || Kitt Peak || Spacewatch ||  || align=right | 2.8 km || 
|-id=447 bgcolor=#d6d6d6
| 499447 ||  || — || March 13, 2010 || Mount Lemmon || Mount Lemmon Survey ||  || align=right | 3.3 km || 
|-id=448 bgcolor=#d6d6d6
| 499448 ||  || — || February 19, 2010 || Mount Lemmon || Mount Lemmon Survey ||  || align=right | 3.4 km || 
|-id=449 bgcolor=#d6d6d6
| 499449 ||  || — || March 10, 2005 || Mount Lemmon || Mount Lemmon Survey ||  || align=right | 2.0 km || 
|-id=450 bgcolor=#d6d6d6
| 499450 ||  || — || February 15, 2010 || Kitt Peak || Spacewatch ||  || align=right | 2.5 km || 
|-id=451 bgcolor=#E9E9E9
| 499451 ||  || — || January 8, 2010 || Kitt Peak || Spacewatch ||  || align=right | 2.2 km || 
|-id=452 bgcolor=#d6d6d6
| 499452 ||  || — || February 18, 2010 || Kitt Peak || Spacewatch || KOR || align=right | 1.6 km || 
|-id=453 bgcolor=#d6d6d6
| 499453 ||  || — || January 13, 2010 || WISE || WISE ||  || align=right | 3.2 km || 
|-id=454 bgcolor=#d6d6d6
| 499454 ||  || — || March 15, 2010 || Kitt Peak || Spacewatch ||  || align=right | 2.5 km || 
|-id=455 bgcolor=#E9E9E9
| 499455 ||  || — || November 17, 2000 || Kitt Peak || Spacewatch ||  || align=right | 1.2 km || 
|-id=456 bgcolor=#d6d6d6
| 499456 ||  || — || March 15, 2010 || La Sagra || OAM Obs. ||  || align=right | 3.1 km || 
|-id=457 bgcolor=#d6d6d6
| 499457 ||  || — || March 4, 2010 || Kitt Peak || Spacewatch || ALA || align=right | 2.7 km || 
|-id=458 bgcolor=#d6d6d6
| 499458 ||  || — || March 15, 2010 || Kitt Peak || Spacewatch ||  || align=right | 2.5 km || 
|-id=459 bgcolor=#d6d6d6
| 499459 ||  || — || February 18, 2010 || Mount Lemmon || Mount Lemmon Survey || ALA || align=right | 5.7 km || 
|-id=460 bgcolor=#d6d6d6
| 499460 ||  || — || March 13, 2010 || Mount Lemmon || Mount Lemmon Survey ||  || align=right | 2.2 km || 
|-id=461 bgcolor=#d6d6d6
| 499461 ||  || — || February 18, 2010 || Mount Lemmon || Mount Lemmon Survey || THB || align=right | 2.8 km || 
|-id=462 bgcolor=#d6d6d6
| 499462 ||  || — || December 21, 2008 || Kitt Peak || Spacewatch ||  || align=right | 3.5 km || 
|-id=463 bgcolor=#d6d6d6
| 499463 ||  || — || March 12, 2010 || Kitt Peak || Spacewatch ||  || align=right | 2.6 km || 
|-id=464 bgcolor=#d6d6d6
| 499464 ||  || — || October 15, 2007 || Mount Lemmon || Mount Lemmon Survey || KOR || align=right | 2.9 km || 
|-id=465 bgcolor=#fefefe
| 499465 ||  || — || March 18, 2010 || Kitt Peak || Spacewatch ||  || align=right data-sort-value="0.55" | 550 m || 
|-id=466 bgcolor=#d6d6d6
| 499466 ||  || — || April 5, 2010 || Kitt Peak || Spacewatch || EOS || align=right | 1.7 km || 
|-id=467 bgcolor=#d6d6d6
| 499467 ||  || — || January 30, 2010 || WISE || WISE || TRP || align=right | 2.8 km || 
|-id=468 bgcolor=#d6d6d6
| 499468 ||  || — || April 10, 2010 || Kitt Peak || Spacewatch ||  || align=right | 3.0 km || 
|-id=469 bgcolor=#d6d6d6
| 499469 ||  || — || February 1, 2010 || WISE || WISE || LIX || align=right | 2.8 km || 
|-id=470 bgcolor=#E9E9E9
| 499470 ||  || — || April 6, 2010 || Mount Lemmon || Mount Lemmon Survey || DOR || align=right | 2.3 km || 
|-id=471 bgcolor=#d6d6d6
| 499471 ||  || — || April 20, 2010 || Mount Lemmon || Mount Lemmon Survey || TIR || align=right | 3.2 km || 
|-id=472 bgcolor=#d6d6d6
| 499472 ||  || — || April 19, 2010 || Bergisch Gladbach || W. Bickel || LIX || align=right | 4.5 km || 
|-id=473 bgcolor=#d6d6d6
| 499473 ||  || — || May 1, 2010 || WISE || WISE ||  || align=right | 3.0 km || 
|-id=474 bgcolor=#d6d6d6
| 499474 ||  || — || May 7, 2010 || Mount Lemmon || Mount Lemmon Survey || EUP || align=right | 3.4 km || 
|-id=475 bgcolor=#fefefe
| 499475 ||  || — || May 3, 2010 || Kitt Peak || Spacewatch ||  || align=right data-sort-value="0.65" | 650 m || 
|-id=476 bgcolor=#d6d6d6
| 499476 ||  || — || May 4, 2010 || Kitt Peak || Spacewatch ||  || align=right | 2.5 km || 
|-id=477 bgcolor=#fefefe
| 499477 ||  || — || April 10, 2010 || Kitt Peak || Spacewatch ||  || align=right data-sort-value="0.59" | 590 m || 
|-id=478 bgcolor=#fefefe
| 499478 ||  || — || May 4, 2010 || Kitt Peak || Spacewatch ||  || align=right data-sort-value="0.63" | 630 m || 
|-id=479 bgcolor=#FA8072
| 499479 ||  || — || May 15, 2010 || Mount Lemmon || Mount Lemmon Survey || H || align=right data-sort-value="0.67" | 670 m || 
|-id=480 bgcolor=#d6d6d6
| 499480 ||  || — || November 21, 2003 || Kitt Peak || Spacewatch ||  || align=right | 3.1 km || 
|-id=481 bgcolor=#d6d6d6
| 499481 ||  || — || February 6, 2010 || Mount Lemmon || Mount Lemmon Survey ||  || align=right | 3.5 km || 
|-id=482 bgcolor=#d6d6d6
| 499482 ||  || — || May 11, 2010 || Mount Lemmon || Mount Lemmon Survey || EOS || align=right | 2.8 km || 
|-id=483 bgcolor=#d6d6d6
| 499483 ||  || — || March 16, 2004 || Kitt Peak || Spacewatch || THM || align=right | 2.2 km || 
|-id=484 bgcolor=#fefefe
| 499484 ||  || — || May 12, 2010 || WISE || WISE ||  || align=right | 1.5 km || 
|-id=485 bgcolor=#d6d6d6
| 499485 ||  || — || January 30, 2009 || Mount Lemmon || Mount Lemmon Survey || EOS || align=right | 1.8 km || 
|-id=486 bgcolor=#d6d6d6
| 499486 ||  || — || February 17, 2010 || Kitt Peak || Spacewatch ||  || align=right | 2.8 km || 
|-id=487 bgcolor=#fefefe
| 499487 ||  || — || May 31, 2010 || WISE || WISE ||  || align=right | 1.3 km || 
|-id=488 bgcolor=#fefefe
| 499488 ||  || — || June 7, 2010 || Kitt Peak || Spacewatch ||  || align=right data-sort-value="0.52" | 520 m || 
|-id=489 bgcolor=#fefefe
| 499489 ||  || — || June 12, 2010 || WISE || WISE ||  || align=right | 1.5 km || 
|-id=490 bgcolor=#FFC2E0
| 499490 ||  || — || June 18, 2010 || Mount Lemmon || Mount Lemmon Survey || AMOcritical || align=right | 1.2 km || 
|-id=491 bgcolor=#fefefe
| 499491 ||  || — || June 25, 2010 || WISE || WISE ||  || align=right | 1.9 km || 
|-id=492 bgcolor=#fefefe
| 499492 ||  || — || June 25, 2010 || WISE || WISE ||  || align=right | 1.5 km || 
|-id=493 bgcolor=#fefefe
| 499493 ||  || — || June 25, 2010 || WISE || WISE ||  || align=right | 1.3 km || 
|-id=494 bgcolor=#fefefe
| 499494 ||  || — || June 25, 2010 || WISE || WISE ||  || align=right | 1.2 km || 
|-id=495 bgcolor=#fefefe
| 499495 ||  || — || June 27, 2010 || WISE || WISE ||  || align=right | 1.3 km || 
|-id=496 bgcolor=#FFC2E0
| 499496 ||  || — || June 22, 2010 || WISE || WISE || AMO || align=right data-sort-value="0.36" | 360 m || 
|-id=497 bgcolor=#fefefe
| 499497 ||  || — || June 28, 2010 || WISE || WISE ||  || align=right | 1.6 km || 
|-id=498 bgcolor=#fefefe
| 499498 ||  || — || June 29, 2010 || WISE || WISE ||  || align=right | 1.2 km || 
|-id=499 bgcolor=#d6d6d6
| 499499 ||  || — || July 11, 2010 || WISE || WISE ||  || align=right | 3.7 km || 
|-id=500 bgcolor=#d6d6d6
| 499500 ||  || — || March 20, 2010 || Kitt Peak || Spacewatch ||  || align=right | 2.8 km || 
|}

499501–499600 

|-bgcolor=#fefefe
| 499501 ||  || — || July 9, 2010 || WISE || WISE ||  || align=right | 1.6 km || 
|-id=502 bgcolor=#d6d6d6
| 499502 ||  || — || July 9, 2010 || WISE || WISE || 3:2 || align=right | 4.1 km || 
|-id=503 bgcolor=#d6d6d6
| 499503 ||  || — || July 10, 2010 || WISE || WISE ||  || align=right | 3.2 km || 
|-id=504 bgcolor=#fefefe
| 499504 ||  || — || July 1, 2010 || WISE || WISE ||  || align=right | 1.2 km || 
|-id=505 bgcolor=#fefefe
| 499505 ||  || — || July 17, 2010 || WISE || WISE ||  || align=right | 1.2 km || 
|-id=506 bgcolor=#fefefe
| 499506 ||  || — || July 17, 2010 || WISE || WISE ||  || align=right | 1.4 km || 
|-id=507 bgcolor=#d6d6d6
| 499507 ||  || — || May 5, 2008 || Mount Lemmon || Mount Lemmon Survey || SHU3:2 || align=right | 4.2 km || 
|-id=508 bgcolor=#d6d6d6
| 499508 ||  || — || January 29, 2010 || WISE || WISE || EUP || align=right | 4.2 km || 
|-id=509 bgcolor=#fefefe
| 499509 ||  || — || July 21, 2010 || WISE || WISE ||  || align=right | 1.2 km || 
|-id=510 bgcolor=#d6d6d6
| 499510 ||  || — || July 27, 2010 || WISE || WISE ||  || align=right | 5.3 km || 
|-id=511 bgcolor=#fefefe
| 499511 ||  || — || July 27, 2010 || WISE || WISE ||  || align=right | 1.6 km || 
|-id=512 bgcolor=#d6d6d6
| 499512 ||  || — || July 29, 2010 || WISE || WISE || LIX || align=right | 3.7 km || 
|-id=513 bgcolor=#fefefe
| 499513 ||  || — || July 30, 2010 || WISE || WISE || ERI || align=right | 1.2 km || 
|-id=514 bgcolor=#C2E0FF
| 499514 ||  || — || July 31, 2010 || Haleakala || Pan-STARRS || other TNO || align=right | 502 km || 
|-id=515 bgcolor=#fefefe
| 499515 ||  || — || October 14, 2007 || Mount Lemmon || Mount Lemmon Survey ||  || align=right data-sort-value="0.64" | 640 m || 
|-id=516 bgcolor=#fefefe
| 499516 ||  || — || August 7, 2010 || La Sagra || OAM Obs. || NYS || align=right data-sort-value="0.60" | 600 m || 
|-id=517 bgcolor=#FA8072
| 499517 ||  || — || August 7, 2010 || La Sagra || OAM Obs. ||  || align=right data-sort-value="0.75" | 750 m || 
|-id=518 bgcolor=#d6d6d6
| 499518 ||  || — || February 15, 2010 || WISE || WISE || ALA || align=right | 3.7 km || 
|-id=519 bgcolor=#fefefe
| 499519 ||  || — || August 13, 2010 || Socorro || LINEAR || PHO || align=right data-sort-value="0.85" | 850 m || 
|-id=520 bgcolor=#fefefe
| 499520 ||  || — || August 10, 2010 || Kitt Peak || Spacewatch ||  || align=right data-sort-value="0.60" | 600 m || 
|-id=521 bgcolor=#fefefe
| 499521 ||  || — || August 10, 2010 || Kitt Peak || Spacewatch || NYS || align=right data-sort-value="0.39" | 390 m || 
|-id=522 bgcolor=#C7FF8F
| 499522 ||  || — || August 14, 2010 || La Silla || D. L. Rabinowitz, M. E. Schwamb, S. Tourtellotte || centaur || align=right | 117 km || 
|-id=523 bgcolor=#fefefe
| 499523 ||  || — || August 11, 2010 || La Sagra || OAM Obs. ||  || align=right data-sort-value="0.79" | 790 m || 
|-id=524 bgcolor=#fefefe
| 499524 ||  || — || August 11, 2010 || La Sagra || OAM Obs. ||  || align=right data-sort-value="0.66" | 660 m || 
|-id=525 bgcolor=#fefefe
| 499525 ||  || — || August 14, 2010 || Kitt Peak || Spacewatch || NYS || align=right data-sort-value="0.73" | 730 m || 
|-id=526 bgcolor=#E9E9E9
| 499526 Romhányi ||  ||  || September 2, 2010 || Piszkéstető || K. Sárneczky, Z. Kuli ||  || align=right | 1.2 km || 
|-id=527 bgcolor=#fefefe
| 499527 ||  || — || December 18, 2000 || Kitt Peak || Spacewatch ||  || align=right data-sort-value="0.79" | 790 m || 
|-id=528 bgcolor=#fefefe
| 499528 ||  || — || September 21, 2003 || Kitt Peak || Spacewatch ||  || align=right data-sort-value="0.46" | 460 m || 
|-id=529 bgcolor=#fefefe
| 499529 ||  || — || September 4, 2010 || Kitt Peak || Spacewatch ||  || align=right data-sort-value="0.64" | 640 m || 
|-id=530 bgcolor=#fefefe
| 499530 ||  || — || September 5, 2010 || La Sagra || OAM Obs. ||  || align=right data-sort-value="0.71" | 710 m || 
|-id=531 bgcolor=#fefefe
| 499531 ||  || — || September 2, 2010 || Mount Lemmon || Mount Lemmon Survey ||  || align=right data-sort-value="0.75" | 750 m || 
|-id=532 bgcolor=#fefefe
| 499532 ||  || — || October 21, 2003 || Kitt Peak || Spacewatch ||  || align=right data-sort-value="0.64" | 640 m || 
|-id=533 bgcolor=#fefefe
| 499533 ||  || — || June 15, 2010 || Mount Lemmon || Mount Lemmon Survey ||  || align=right data-sort-value="0.63" | 630 m || 
|-id=534 bgcolor=#fefefe
| 499534 ||  || — || September 11, 2010 || Kitt Peak || Spacewatch ||  || align=right data-sort-value="0.75" | 750 m || 
|-id=535 bgcolor=#d6d6d6
| 499535 ||  || — || October 25, 2005 || Kitt Peak || Spacewatch ||  || align=right | 2.1 km || 
|-id=536 bgcolor=#fefefe
| 499536 ||  || — || September 4, 2010 || La Sagra || OAM Obs. ||  || align=right data-sort-value="0.58" | 580 m || 
|-id=537 bgcolor=#fefefe
| 499537 ||  || — || November 17, 2007 || Mount Lemmon || Mount Lemmon Survey ||  || align=right data-sort-value="0.63" | 630 m || 
|-id=538 bgcolor=#fefefe
| 499538 ||  || — || September 10, 2010 || Kitt Peak || Spacewatch ||  || align=right data-sort-value="0.64" | 640 m || 
|-id=539 bgcolor=#fefefe
| 499539 ||  || — || October 18, 2003 || Kitt Peak || Spacewatch ||  || align=right data-sort-value="0.61" | 610 m || 
|-id=540 bgcolor=#fefefe
| 499540 ||  || — || September 10, 2010 || Kitt Peak || Spacewatch ||  || align=right data-sort-value="0.61" | 610 m || 
|-id=541 bgcolor=#fefefe
| 499541 ||  || — || September 11, 2010 || Kitt Peak || Spacewatch || MAS || align=right data-sort-value="0.63" | 630 m || 
|-id=542 bgcolor=#fefefe
| 499542 ||  || — || September 10, 2010 || La Sagra || OAM Obs. ||  || align=right data-sort-value="0.70" | 700 m || 
|-id=543 bgcolor=#fefefe
| 499543 ||  || — || September 11, 2010 || Kitt Peak || Spacewatch || MAS || align=right data-sort-value="0.58" | 580 m || 
|-id=544 bgcolor=#fefefe
| 499544 ||  || — || September 11, 2010 || Kitt Peak || Spacewatch ||  || align=right data-sort-value="0.70" | 700 m || 
|-id=545 bgcolor=#fefefe
| 499545 ||  || — || February 8, 2008 || Kitt Peak || Spacewatch || NYS || align=right data-sort-value="0.64" | 640 m || 
|-id=546 bgcolor=#fefefe
| 499546 ||  || — || September 18, 2003 || Kitt Peak || Spacewatch || NYS || align=right data-sort-value="0.59" | 590 m || 
|-id=547 bgcolor=#fefefe
| 499547 ||  || — || March 23, 2009 || Mount Lemmon || Mount Lemmon Survey ||  || align=right data-sort-value="0.75" | 750 m || 
|-id=548 bgcolor=#fefefe
| 499548 ||  || — || September 12, 2010 || Kitt Peak || Spacewatch || NYS || align=right data-sort-value="0.49" | 490 m || 
|-id=549 bgcolor=#fefefe
| 499549 ||  || — || September 12, 2010 || Kitt Peak || Spacewatch ||  || align=right | 1.1 km || 
|-id=550 bgcolor=#fefefe
| 499550 ||  || — || August 14, 2010 || Kitt Peak || Spacewatch || MAS || align=right data-sort-value="0.53" | 530 m || 
|-id=551 bgcolor=#fefefe
| 499551 ||  || — || September 16, 2003 || Kitt Peak || Spacewatch ||  || align=right data-sort-value="0.59" | 590 m || 
|-id=552 bgcolor=#fefefe
| 499552 ||  || — || September 11, 2010 || Kitt Peak || Spacewatch || V || align=right data-sort-value="0.45" | 450 m || 
|-id=553 bgcolor=#fefefe
| 499553 ||  || — || February 13, 2008 || Mount Lemmon || Mount Lemmon Survey ||  || align=right data-sort-value="0.55" | 550 m || 
|-id=554 bgcolor=#fefefe
| 499554 ||  || — || September 14, 2010 || Kitt Peak || Spacewatch ||  || align=right data-sort-value="0.56" | 560 m || 
|-id=555 bgcolor=#fefefe
| 499555 ||  || — || September 14, 2010 || Kitt Peak || Spacewatch ||  || align=right data-sort-value="0.60" | 600 m || 
|-id=556 bgcolor=#fefefe
| 499556 ||  || — || June 23, 2010 || Mount Lemmon || Mount Lemmon Survey ||  || align=right data-sort-value="0.72" | 720 m || 
|-id=557 bgcolor=#fefefe
| 499557 ||  || — || September 4, 2010 || Kitt Peak || Spacewatch || V || align=right data-sort-value="0.64" | 640 m || 
|-id=558 bgcolor=#fefefe
| 499558 ||  || — || February 9, 2008 || Kitt Peak || Spacewatch || MAS || align=right data-sort-value="0.53" | 530 m || 
|-id=559 bgcolor=#fefefe
| 499559 ||  || — || September 15, 2010 || Kitt Peak || Spacewatch || V || align=right data-sort-value="0.50" | 500 m || 
|-id=560 bgcolor=#fefefe
| 499560 ||  || — || November 24, 2003 || Anderson Mesa || LONEOS ||  || align=right data-sort-value="0.64" | 640 m || 
|-id=561 bgcolor=#fefefe
| 499561 ||  || — || September 15, 2010 || Kitt Peak || Spacewatch ||  || align=right data-sort-value="0.67" | 670 m || 
|-id=562 bgcolor=#fefefe
| 499562 ||  || — || September 2, 2010 || Mount Lemmon || Mount Lemmon Survey ||  || align=right data-sort-value="0.62" | 620 m || 
|-id=563 bgcolor=#fefefe
| 499563 ||  || — || September 9, 2010 || Kitt Peak || Spacewatch ||  || align=right data-sort-value="0.60" | 600 m || 
|-id=564 bgcolor=#fefefe
| 499564 ||  || — || September 3, 2010 || Mount Lemmon || Mount Lemmon Survey ||  || align=right data-sort-value="0.78" | 780 m || 
|-id=565 bgcolor=#fefefe
| 499565 ||  || — || September 4, 2010 || Mount Lemmon || Mount Lemmon Survey ||  || align=right data-sort-value="0.57" | 570 m || 
|-id=566 bgcolor=#fefefe
| 499566 ||  || — || September 27, 2010 || Kitt Peak || Spacewatch ||  || align=right data-sort-value="0.59" | 590 m || 
|-id=567 bgcolor=#fefefe
| 499567 ||  || — || September 17, 2003 || Kitt Peak || Spacewatch ||  || align=right data-sort-value="0.44" | 440 m || 
|-id=568 bgcolor=#fefefe
| 499568 ||  || — || September 29, 2010 || Mount Lemmon || Mount Lemmon Survey ||  || align=right data-sort-value="0.80" | 800 m || 
|-id=569 bgcolor=#fefefe
| 499569 ||  || — || September 19, 2003 || Kitt Peak || Spacewatch ||  || align=right data-sort-value="0.64" | 640 m || 
|-id=570 bgcolor=#fefefe
| 499570 ||  || — || October 27, 2003 || Kitt Peak || Spacewatch ||  || align=right data-sort-value="0.54" | 540 m || 
|-id=571 bgcolor=#fefefe
| 499571 ||  || — || September 29, 2010 || Kitt Peak || Spacewatch || MAS || align=right data-sort-value="0.56" | 560 m || 
|-id=572 bgcolor=#fefefe
| 499572 ||  || — || September 17, 2010 || Kitt Peak || Spacewatch || EUT || align=right data-sort-value="0.67" | 670 m || 
|-id=573 bgcolor=#fefefe
| 499573 ||  || — || September 15, 2010 || Kitt Peak || Spacewatch ||  || align=right data-sort-value="0.69" | 690 m || 
|-id=574 bgcolor=#fefefe
| 499574 ||  || — || February 8, 2008 || Kitt Peak || Spacewatch ||  || align=right data-sort-value="0.73" | 730 m || 
|-id=575 bgcolor=#fefefe
| 499575 ||  || — || September 10, 2010 || Kitt Peak || Spacewatch ||  || align=right data-sort-value="0.56" | 560 m || 
|-id=576 bgcolor=#fefefe
| 499576 ||  || — || November 19, 2007 || Mount Lemmon || Mount Lemmon Survey ||  || align=right data-sort-value="0.67" | 670 m || 
|-id=577 bgcolor=#fefefe
| 499577 ||  || — || September 15, 2010 || Kitt Peak || Spacewatch || EUT || align=right data-sort-value="0.56" | 560 m || 
|-id=578 bgcolor=#fefefe
| 499578 ||  || — || October 2, 2010 || La Sagra || OAM Obs. ||  || align=right | 1.1 km || 
|-id=579 bgcolor=#fefefe
| 499579 ||  || — || October 3, 2010 || Kitt Peak || Spacewatch ||  || align=right data-sort-value="0.70" | 700 m || 
|-id=580 bgcolor=#fefefe
| 499580 ||  || — || October 3, 2010 || Kitt Peak || Spacewatch ||  || align=right data-sort-value="0.65" | 650 m || 
|-id=581 bgcolor=#fefefe
| 499581 ||  || — || December 31, 2007 || Mount Lemmon || Mount Lemmon Survey ||  || align=right data-sort-value="0.60" | 600 m || 
|-id=582 bgcolor=#FFC2E0
| 499582 ||  || — || October 7, 2010 || Catalina || CSS || APOPHA || align=right data-sort-value="0.46" | 460 m || 
|-id=583 bgcolor=#fefefe
| 499583 ||  || — || October 2, 2010 || Socorro || LINEAR || NYS || align=right data-sort-value="0.56" | 560 m || 
|-id=584 bgcolor=#fefefe
| 499584 ||  || — || October 1, 2003 || Kitt Peak || Spacewatch ||  || align=right data-sort-value="0.49" | 490 m || 
|-id=585 bgcolor=#fefefe
| 499585 ||  || — || October 2, 2010 || Kitt Peak || Spacewatch ||  || align=right data-sort-value="0.65" | 650 m || 
|-id=586 bgcolor=#fefefe
| 499586 ||  || — || September 28, 2003 || Kitt Peak || Spacewatch || NYS || align=right data-sort-value="0.38" | 380 m || 
|-id=587 bgcolor=#fefefe
| 499587 ||  || — || January 30, 2008 || Mount Lemmon || Mount Lemmon Survey || NYS || align=right data-sort-value="0.51" | 510 m || 
|-id=588 bgcolor=#fefefe
| 499588 ||  || — || October 2, 2010 || Socorro || LINEAR ||  || align=right data-sort-value="0.91" | 910 m || 
|-id=589 bgcolor=#fefefe
| 499589 ||  || — || September 16, 2010 || Mount Lemmon || Mount Lemmon Survey ||  || align=right data-sort-value="0.91" | 910 m || 
|-id=590 bgcolor=#fefefe
| 499590 ||  || — || September 19, 2010 || Kitt Peak || Spacewatch || NYS || align=right data-sort-value="0.49" | 490 m || 
|-id=591 bgcolor=#fefefe
| 499591 ||  || — || September 19, 2010 || Kitt Peak || Spacewatch || V || align=right data-sort-value="0.56" | 560 m || 
|-id=592 bgcolor=#fefefe
| 499592 ||  || — || October 18, 2003 || Kitt Peak || Spacewatch ||  || align=right data-sort-value="0.62" | 620 m || 
|-id=593 bgcolor=#fefefe
| 499593 ||  || — || October 8, 2010 || Kitt Peak || Spacewatch ||  || align=right data-sort-value="0.59" | 590 m || 
|-id=594 bgcolor=#fefefe
| 499594 ||  || — || September 4, 2010 || Kitt Peak || Spacewatch ||  || align=right data-sort-value="0.61" | 610 m || 
|-id=595 bgcolor=#fefefe
| 499595 ||  || — || September 18, 2010 || Mount Lemmon || Mount Lemmon Survey ||  || align=right data-sort-value="0.60" | 600 m || 
|-id=596 bgcolor=#fefefe
| 499596 ||  || — || October 20, 2003 || Kitt Peak || Spacewatch ||  || align=right data-sort-value="0.44" | 440 m || 
|-id=597 bgcolor=#fefefe
| 499597 ||  || — || September 4, 2010 || Kitt Peak || Spacewatch ||  || align=right data-sort-value="0.62" | 620 m || 
|-id=598 bgcolor=#fefefe
| 499598 ||  || — || September 10, 2010 || Kitt Peak || Spacewatch ||  || align=right data-sort-value="0.52" | 520 m || 
|-id=599 bgcolor=#FA8072
| 499599 ||  || — || October 9, 2010 || Catalina || CSS || H || align=right data-sort-value="0.57" | 570 m || 
|-id=600 bgcolor=#fefefe
| 499600 ||  || — || September 17, 2003 || Kitt Peak || Spacewatch ||  || align=right data-sort-value="0.60" | 600 m || 
|}

499601–499700 

|-bgcolor=#fefefe
| 499601 ||  || — || November 20, 2003 || Socorro || LINEAR ||  || align=right data-sort-value="0.86" | 860 m || 
|-id=602 bgcolor=#fefefe
| 499602 ||  || — || October 9, 2010 || Catalina || CSS || V || align=right data-sort-value="0.62" | 620 m || 
|-id=603 bgcolor=#fefefe
| 499603 ||  || — || October 10, 2010 || Kitt Peak || Spacewatch ||  || align=right data-sort-value="0.68" | 680 m || 
|-id=604 bgcolor=#fefefe
| 499604 ||  || — || September 17, 2010 || Kitt Peak || Spacewatch || MAS || align=right data-sort-value="0.54" | 540 m || 
|-id=605 bgcolor=#fefefe
| 499605 ||  || — || December 1, 2003 || Kitt Peak || Spacewatch ||  || align=right data-sort-value="0.52" | 520 m || 
|-id=606 bgcolor=#fefefe
| 499606 ||  || — || September 17, 2010 || Mount Lemmon || Mount Lemmon Survey ||  || align=right data-sort-value="0.66" | 660 m || 
|-id=607 bgcolor=#fefefe
| 499607 ||  || — || October 23, 2003 || Kitt Peak || Spacewatch ||  || align=right data-sort-value="0.74" | 740 m || 
|-id=608 bgcolor=#E9E9E9
| 499608 ||  || — || September 30, 2006 || Mount Lemmon || Mount Lemmon Survey ||  || align=right | 1.2 km || 
|-id=609 bgcolor=#fefefe
| 499609 ||  || — || October 7, 2010 || Catalina || CSS ||  || align=right data-sort-value="0.85" | 850 m || 
|-id=610 bgcolor=#fefefe
| 499610 ||  || — || October 2, 2003 || Kitt Peak || Spacewatch ||  || align=right data-sort-value="0.56" | 560 m || 
|-id=611 bgcolor=#fefefe
| 499611 ||  || — || September 7, 1999 || Socorro || LINEAR ||  || align=right | 1.3 km || 
|-id=612 bgcolor=#fefefe
| 499612 ||  || — || October 17, 2010 || Mount Lemmon || Mount Lemmon Survey ||  || align=right data-sort-value="0.65" | 650 m || 
|-id=613 bgcolor=#fefefe
| 499613 ||  || — || June 18, 2006 || Kitt Peak || Spacewatch || MAS || align=right data-sort-value="0.62" | 620 m || 
|-id=614 bgcolor=#fefefe
| 499614 ||  || — || November 30, 2003 || Kitt Peak || Spacewatch || MAS || align=right data-sort-value="0.56" | 560 m || 
|-id=615 bgcolor=#fefefe
| 499615 ||  || — || September 18, 2006 || Anderson Mesa || LONEOS || MAS || align=right data-sort-value="0.66" | 660 m || 
|-id=616 bgcolor=#fefefe
| 499616 ||  || — || October 29, 2010 || Mount Lemmon || Mount Lemmon Survey ||  || align=right data-sort-value="0.89" | 890 m || 
|-id=617 bgcolor=#fefefe
| 499617 ||  || — || September 17, 2006 || Kitt Peak || Spacewatch ||  || align=right data-sort-value="0.66" | 660 m || 
|-id=618 bgcolor=#fefefe
| 499618 ||  || — || September 15, 2006 || Kitt Peak || Spacewatch ||  || align=right data-sort-value="0.49" | 490 m || 
|-id=619 bgcolor=#fefefe
| 499619 ||  || — || July 24, 2010 || WISE || WISE ||  || align=right | 2.2 km || 
|-id=620 bgcolor=#fefefe
| 499620 ||  || — || October 11, 2010 || Mount Lemmon || Mount Lemmon Survey ||  || align=right data-sort-value="0.66" | 660 m || 
|-id=621 bgcolor=#fefefe
| 499621 ||  || — || September 17, 2006 || Kitt Peak || Spacewatch || NYS || align=right data-sort-value="0.60" | 600 m || 
|-id=622 bgcolor=#fefefe
| 499622 ||  || — || February 12, 2008 || Kitt Peak || Spacewatch ||  || align=right data-sort-value="0.77" | 770 m || 
|-id=623 bgcolor=#fefefe
| 499623 ||  || — || October 31, 2010 || Kitt Peak || Spacewatch || NYS || align=right data-sort-value="0.59" | 590 m || 
|-id=624 bgcolor=#fefefe
| 499624 ||  || — || October 14, 2010 || Mount Lemmon || Mount Lemmon Survey ||  || align=right data-sort-value="0.64" | 640 m || 
|-id=625 bgcolor=#fefefe
| 499625 ||  || — || October 19, 2010 || Mount Lemmon || Mount Lemmon Survey || NYS || align=right data-sort-value="0.67" | 670 m || 
|-id=626 bgcolor=#d6d6d6
| 499626 ||  || — || July 27, 2009 || Kitt Peak || Spacewatch || SHU3:2 || align=right | 6.9 km || 
|-id=627 bgcolor=#fefefe
| 499627 ||  || — || October 30, 2010 || Kitt Peak || Spacewatch ||  || align=right data-sort-value="0.62" | 620 m || 
|-id=628 bgcolor=#E9E9E9
| 499628 ||  || — || January 12, 2008 || Mount Lemmon || Mount Lemmon Survey ||  || align=right data-sort-value="0.93" | 930 m || 
|-id=629 bgcolor=#fefefe
| 499629 ||  || — || October 2, 2010 || La Sagra || OAM Obs. || NYS || align=right data-sort-value="0.63" | 630 m || 
|-id=630 bgcolor=#fefefe
| 499630 ||  || — || September 17, 2010 || Kitt Peak || Spacewatch || V || align=right data-sort-value="0.62" | 620 m || 
|-id=631 bgcolor=#fefefe
| 499631 ||  || — || August 21, 2006 || Kitt Peak || Spacewatch || NYS || align=right data-sort-value="0.51" | 510 m || 
|-id=632 bgcolor=#E9E9E9
| 499632 ||  || — || November 16, 2006 || Kitt Peak || Spacewatch ||  || align=right | 1.0 km || 
|-id=633 bgcolor=#fefefe
| 499633 ||  || — || February 15, 1997 || Kitt Peak || Spacewatch ||  || align=right data-sort-value="0.93" | 930 m || 
|-id=634 bgcolor=#fefefe
| 499634 ||  || — || October 13, 2010 || Mount Lemmon || Mount Lemmon Survey || V || align=right data-sort-value="0.55" | 550 m || 
|-id=635 bgcolor=#fefefe
| 499635 ||  || — || October 11, 2010 || Mount Lemmon || Mount Lemmon Survey || V || align=right data-sort-value="0.57" | 570 m || 
|-id=636 bgcolor=#fefefe
| 499636 ||  || — || October 17, 2010 || Mount Lemmon || Mount Lemmon Survey ||  || align=right data-sort-value="0.79" | 790 m || 
|-id=637 bgcolor=#fefefe
| 499637 ||  || — || October 2, 2010 || Kitt Peak || Spacewatch || NYS || align=right data-sort-value="0.70" | 700 m || 
|-id=638 bgcolor=#fefefe
| 499638 ||  || — || October 28, 2010 || Kitt Peak || Spacewatch ||  || align=right data-sort-value="0.77" | 770 m || 
|-id=639 bgcolor=#fefefe
| 499639 ||  || — || September 18, 2010 || Mount Lemmon || Mount Lemmon Survey || NYS || align=right data-sort-value="0.70" | 700 m || 
|-id=640 bgcolor=#fefefe
| 499640 ||  || — || November 1, 2010 || Kitt Peak || Spacewatch || NYS || align=right data-sort-value="0.58" | 580 m || 
|-id=641 bgcolor=#fefefe
| 499641 ||  || — || April 18, 2009 || Mount Lemmon || Mount Lemmon Survey || NYS || align=right data-sort-value="0.58" | 580 m || 
|-id=642 bgcolor=#fefefe
| 499642 ||  || — || November 2, 2010 || Kitt Peak || Spacewatch ||  || align=right data-sort-value="0.61" | 610 m || 
|-id=643 bgcolor=#fefefe
| 499643 ||  || — || October 16, 2006 || Mount Lemmon || Mount Lemmon Survey || V || align=right data-sort-value="0.52" | 520 m || 
|-id=644 bgcolor=#fefefe
| 499644 ||  || — || September 11, 2010 || Mount Lemmon || Mount Lemmon Survey || NYS || align=right data-sort-value="0.53" | 530 m || 
|-id=645 bgcolor=#fefefe
| 499645 ||  || — || October 30, 2010 || Kitt Peak || Spacewatch ||  || align=right data-sort-value="0.77" | 770 m || 
|-id=646 bgcolor=#fefefe
| 499646 ||  || — || November 5, 2010 || Mount Lemmon || Mount Lemmon Survey ||  || align=right data-sort-value="0.81" | 810 m || 
|-id=647 bgcolor=#fefefe
| 499647 ||  || — || February 10, 2008 || Kitt Peak || Spacewatch || NYS || align=right data-sort-value="0.57" | 570 m || 
|-id=648 bgcolor=#fefefe
| 499648 ||  || — || November 6, 2010 || Catalina || CSS ||  || align=right data-sort-value="0.85" | 850 m || 
|-id=649 bgcolor=#fefefe
| 499649 ||  || — || November 3, 2010 || Mount Lemmon || Mount Lemmon Survey || MAS || align=right data-sort-value="0.58" | 580 m || 
|-id=650 bgcolor=#d6d6d6
| 499650 ||  || — || October 14, 2010 || Mount Lemmon || Mount Lemmon Survey || 3:2 || align=right | 4.4 km || 
|-id=651 bgcolor=#fefefe
| 499651 ||  || — || September 14, 2006 || Catalina || CSS || NYS || align=right data-sort-value="0.52" | 520 m || 
|-id=652 bgcolor=#fefefe
| 499652 ||  || — || November 6, 2010 || Kitt Peak || Spacewatch || MAS || align=right data-sort-value="0.49" | 490 m || 
|-id=653 bgcolor=#fefefe
| 499653 ||  || — || November 2, 2010 || Kitt Peak || Spacewatch ||  || align=right data-sort-value="0.75" | 750 m || 
|-id=654 bgcolor=#fefefe
| 499654 ||  || — || September 17, 2010 || Mount Lemmon || Mount Lemmon Survey || MAS || align=right data-sort-value="0.61" | 610 m || 
|-id=655 bgcolor=#fefefe
| 499655 ||  || — || September 11, 2010 || Mount Lemmon || Mount Lemmon Survey || NYS || align=right data-sort-value="0.54" | 540 m || 
|-id=656 bgcolor=#fefefe
| 499656 ||  || — || November 12, 1999 || Socorro || LINEAR ||  || align=right data-sort-value="0.65" | 650 m || 
|-id=657 bgcolor=#fefefe
| 499657 ||  || — || September 17, 2006 || Kitt Peak || Spacewatch ||  || align=right data-sort-value="0.62" | 620 m || 
|-id=658 bgcolor=#fefefe
| 499658 ||  || — || October 12, 2010 || Mount Lemmon || Mount Lemmon Survey ||  || align=right data-sort-value="0.62" | 620 m || 
|-id=659 bgcolor=#fefefe
| 499659 ||  || — || October 30, 2010 || Mount Lemmon || Mount Lemmon Survey ||  || align=right data-sort-value="0.62" | 620 m || 
|-id=660 bgcolor=#fefefe
| 499660 ||  || — || February 28, 2008 || Kitt Peak || Spacewatch || NYS || align=right data-sort-value="0.53" | 530 m || 
|-id=661 bgcolor=#d6d6d6
| 499661 ||  || — || September 11, 2010 || Mount Lemmon || Mount Lemmon Survey ||  || align=right | 1.9 km || 
|-id=662 bgcolor=#fefefe
| 499662 ||  || — || December 6, 1997 || Caussols || ODAS || H || align=right data-sort-value="0.64" | 640 m || 
|-id=663 bgcolor=#fefefe
| 499663 ||  || — || November 1, 2010 || Kitt Peak || Spacewatch || NYS || align=right data-sort-value="0.53" | 530 m || 
|-id=664 bgcolor=#fefefe
| 499664 ||  || — || November 5, 2010 || Kitt Peak || Spacewatch ||  || align=right data-sort-value="0.52" | 520 m || 
|-id=665 bgcolor=#fefefe
| 499665 ||  || — || November 6, 2010 || Mount Lemmon || Mount Lemmon Survey || NYS || align=right data-sort-value="0.49" | 490 m || 
|-id=666 bgcolor=#fefefe
| 499666 ||  || — || February 18, 2008 || Mount Lemmon || Mount Lemmon Survey ||  || align=right data-sort-value="0.64" | 640 m || 
|-id=667 bgcolor=#fefefe
| 499667 ||  || — || October 30, 2010 || Kitt Peak || Spacewatch ||  || align=right data-sort-value="0.60" | 600 m || 
|-id=668 bgcolor=#fefefe
| 499668 ||  || — || August 28, 2006 || Catalina || CSS || NYS || align=right data-sort-value="0.55" | 550 m || 
|-id=669 bgcolor=#fefefe
| 499669 ||  || — || October 30, 1999 || Kitt Peak || Spacewatch ||  || align=right data-sort-value="0.47" | 470 m || 
|-id=670 bgcolor=#fefefe
| 499670 ||  || — || February 10, 2008 || Kitt Peak || Spacewatch ||  || align=right data-sort-value="0.62" | 620 m || 
|-id=671 bgcolor=#fefefe
| 499671 ||  || — || October 14, 2010 || Mount Lemmon || Mount Lemmon Survey || NYS || align=right data-sort-value="0.48" | 480 m || 
|-id=672 bgcolor=#FFC2E0
| 499672 ||  || — || October 25, 1981 || Palomar || S. J. Bus || AMO || align=right data-sort-value="0.72" | 720 m || 
|-id=673 bgcolor=#fefefe
| 499673 ||  || — || February 10, 2008 || Kitt Peak || Spacewatch ||  || align=right data-sort-value="0.83" | 830 m || 
|-id=674 bgcolor=#fefefe
| 499674 ||  || — || December 22, 2003 || Kitt Peak || Spacewatch ||  || align=right data-sort-value="0.79" | 790 m || 
|-id=675 bgcolor=#fefefe
| 499675 ||  || — || November 6, 2010 || Catalina || CSS ||  || align=right | 1.0 km || 
|-id=676 bgcolor=#fefefe
| 499676 ||  || — || October 9, 2010 || Catalina || CSS ||  || align=right data-sort-value="0.68" | 680 m || 
|-id=677 bgcolor=#fefefe
| 499677 ||  || — || September 17, 2010 || Mount Lemmon || Mount Lemmon Survey || V || align=right data-sort-value="0.50" | 500 m || 
|-id=678 bgcolor=#fefefe
| 499678 ||  || — || October 9, 1999 || Catalina || CSS ||  || align=right data-sort-value="0.82" | 820 m || 
|-id=679 bgcolor=#fefefe
| 499679 ||  || — || September 17, 2010 || Mount Lemmon || Mount Lemmon Survey || NYS || align=right data-sort-value="0.57" | 570 m || 
|-id=680 bgcolor=#fefefe
| 499680 ||  || — || September 14, 2006 || Kitt Peak || Spacewatch || V || align=right data-sort-value="0.54" | 540 m || 
|-id=681 bgcolor=#fefefe
| 499681 ||  || — || October 22, 2003 || Kitt Peak || Spacewatch || V || align=right data-sort-value="0.43" | 430 m || 
|-id=682 bgcolor=#fefefe
| 499682 ||  || — || February 17, 2004 || Kitt Peak || Spacewatch || NYS || align=right data-sort-value="0.60" | 600 m || 
|-id=683 bgcolor=#fefefe
| 499683 ||  || — || October 17, 2010 || Mount Lemmon || Mount Lemmon Survey || MAS || align=right data-sort-value="0.53" | 530 m || 
|-id=684 bgcolor=#fefefe
| 499684 ||  || — || April 7, 2005 || Mount Lemmon || Mount Lemmon Survey || V || align=right data-sort-value="0.61" | 610 m || 
|-id=685 bgcolor=#fefefe
| 499685 ||  || — || November 8, 2010 || Kitt Peak || Spacewatch || MAS || align=right data-sort-value="0.73" | 730 m || 
|-id=686 bgcolor=#fefefe
| 499686 ||  || — || November 13, 2010 || Kitt Peak || Spacewatch ||  || align=right data-sort-value="0.56" | 560 m || 
|-id=687 bgcolor=#fefefe
| 499687 ||  || — || November 24, 2006 || Mount Lemmon || Mount Lemmon Survey ||  || align=right data-sort-value="0.84" | 840 m || 
|-id=688 bgcolor=#fefefe
| 499688 ||  || — || November 10, 2010 || Mount Lemmon || Mount Lemmon Survey ||  || align=right data-sort-value="0.65" | 650 m || 
|-id=689 bgcolor=#fefefe
| 499689 ||  || — || September 27, 2006 || Kitt Peak || Spacewatch ||  || align=right data-sort-value="0.56" | 560 m || 
|-id=690 bgcolor=#fefefe
| 499690 ||  || — || October 19, 2006 || Kitt Peak || Spacewatch ||  || align=right data-sort-value="0.65" | 650 m || 
|-id=691 bgcolor=#fefefe
| 499691 ||  || — || October 28, 2006 || Mount Lemmon || Mount Lemmon Survey ||  || align=right data-sort-value="0.58" | 580 m || 
|-id=692 bgcolor=#fefefe
| 499692 ||  || — || November 30, 2010 || Mount Lemmon || Mount Lemmon Survey || NYS || align=right data-sort-value="0.53" | 530 m || 
|-id=693 bgcolor=#fefefe
| 499693 ||  || — || March 18, 2004 || Kitt Peak || Spacewatch ||  || align=right | 1.1 km || 
|-id=694 bgcolor=#fefefe
| 499694 ||  || — || November 12, 2010 || Mount Lemmon || Mount Lemmon Survey ||  || align=right data-sort-value="0.80" | 800 m || 
|-id=695 bgcolor=#fefefe
| 499695 ||  || — || October 13, 2010 || Mount Lemmon || Mount Lemmon Survey ||  || align=right data-sort-value="0.73" | 730 m || 
|-id=696 bgcolor=#fefefe
| 499696 ||  || — || December 3, 2010 || Mount Lemmon || Mount Lemmon Survey ||  || align=right data-sort-value="0.60" | 600 m || 
|-id=697 bgcolor=#E9E9E9
| 499697 ||  || — || December 3, 2010 || Mount Lemmon || Mount Lemmon Survey ||  || align=right | 1.0 km || 
|-id=698 bgcolor=#E9E9E9
| 499698 ||  || — || November 5, 2010 || Mount Lemmon || Mount Lemmon Survey ||  || align=right | 1.3 km || 
|-id=699 bgcolor=#fefefe
| 499699 ||  || — || November 21, 2006 || Mount Lemmon || Mount Lemmon Survey ||  || align=right data-sort-value="0.72" | 720 m || 
|-id=700 bgcolor=#E9E9E9
| 499700 ||  || — || December 15, 2006 || Mount Lemmon || Mount Lemmon Survey || MAR || align=right | 1.1 km || 
|}

499701–499800 

|-bgcolor=#fefefe
| 499701 ||  || — || December 14, 2010 || Mount Lemmon || Mount Lemmon Survey ||  || align=right data-sort-value="0.89" | 890 m || 
|-id=702 bgcolor=#fefefe
| 499702 ||  || — || December 8, 2010 || Kitt Peak || Spacewatch ||  || align=right data-sort-value="0.61" | 610 m || 
|-id=703 bgcolor=#fefefe
| 499703 ||  || — || December 10, 2006 || Kitt Peak || Spacewatch ||  || align=right data-sort-value="0.67" | 670 m || 
|-id=704 bgcolor=#fefefe
| 499704 ||  || — || January 8, 2011 || Catalina || CSS || H || align=right data-sort-value="0.79" | 790 m || 
|-id=705 bgcolor=#E9E9E9
| 499705 ||  || — || January 9, 2011 || Mount Lemmon || Mount Lemmon Survey ||  || align=right | 2.4 km || 
|-id=706 bgcolor=#E9E9E9
| 499706 ||  || — || November 11, 2010 || Mount Lemmon || Mount Lemmon Survey ||  || align=right | 1.5 km || 
|-id=707 bgcolor=#fefefe
| 499707 ||  || — || January 9, 2011 || Kitt Peak || Spacewatch ||  || align=right data-sort-value="0.62" | 620 m || 
|-id=708 bgcolor=#E9E9E9
| 499708 ||  || — || September 14, 2005 || Kitt Peak || Spacewatch ||  || align=right data-sort-value="0.89" | 890 m || 
|-id=709 bgcolor=#E9E9E9
| 499709 ||  || — || December 8, 2010 || Mount Lemmon || Mount Lemmon Survey ||  || align=right | 1.9 km || 
|-id=710 bgcolor=#d6d6d6
| 499710 ||  || — || November 23, 2009 || Mount Lemmon || Mount Lemmon Survey || 3:2 || align=right | 4.8 km || 
|-id=711 bgcolor=#E9E9E9
| 499711 ||  || — || January 10, 2011 || Kitt Peak || Spacewatch ||  || align=right data-sort-value="0.93" | 930 m || 
|-id=712 bgcolor=#fefefe
| 499712 ||  || — || November 20, 2006 || Kitt Peak || Spacewatch ||  || align=right data-sort-value="0.52" | 520 m || 
|-id=713 bgcolor=#fefefe
| 499713 ||  || — || December 13, 2010 || Mount Lemmon || Mount Lemmon Survey ||  || align=right data-sort-value="0.73" | 730 m || 
|-id=714 bgcolor=#E9E9E9
| 499714 ||  || — || February 6, 2007 || Kitt Peak || Spacewatch ||  || align=right data-sort-value="0.91" | 910 m || 
|-id=715 bgcolor=#E9E9E9
| 499715 ||  || — || December 27, 2006 || Mount Lemmon || Mount Lemmon Survey ||  || align=right data-sort-value="0.92" | 920 m || 
|-id=716 bgcolor=#E9E9E9
| 499716 ||  || — || December 25, 2010 || Mount Lemmon || Mount Lemmon Survey || EUN || align=right | 1.7 km || 
|-id=717 bgcolor=#fefefe
| 499717 ||  || — || January 11, 2011 || Kitt Peak || Spacewatch || H || align=right data-sort-value="0.61" | 610 m || 
|-id=718 bgcolor=#fefefe
| 499718 ||  || — || December 25, 2006 || Anderson Mesa || LONEOS ||  || align=right | 1.1 km || 
|-id=719 bgcolor=#fefefe
| 499719 ||  || — || November 7, 2010 || Mount Lemmon || Mount Lemmon Survey ||  || align=right data-sort-value="0.71" | 710 m || 
|-id=720 bgcolor=#fefefe
| 499720 ||  || — || January 16, 2011 || Mount Lemmon || Mount Lemmon Survey || NYS || align=right data-sort-value="0.69" | 690 m || 
|-id=721 bgcolor=#E9E9E9
| 499721 ||  || — || November 21, 2006 || Mount Lemmon || Mount Lemmon Survey ||  || align=right data-sort-value="0.69" | 690 m || 
|-id=722 bgcolor=#E9E9E9
| 499722 ||  || — || January 16, 2011 || Mount Lemmon || Mount Lemmon Survey ||  || align=right | 1.4 km || 
|-id=723 bgcolor=#E9E9E9
| 499723 ||  || — || December 5, 2010 || Mount Lemmon || Mount Lemmon Survey ||  || align=right data-sort-value="0.83" | 830 m || 
|-id=724 bgcolor=#E9E9E9
| 499724 ||  || — || January 16, 2011 || Mount Lemmon || Mount Lemmon Survey ||  || align=right data-sort-value="0.74" | 740 m || 
|-id=725 bgcolor=#E9E9E9
| 499725 ||  || — || December 8, 2010 || Mount Lemmon || Mount Lemmon Survey || BRU || align=right | 2.1 km || 
|-id=726 bgcolor=#E9E9E9
| 499726 ||  || — || December 10, 2010 || Mount Lemmon || Mount Lemmon Survey ||  || align=right | 1.3 km || 
|-id=727 bgcolor=#fefefe
| 499727 ||  || — || January 25, 2011 || Kitt Peak || Spacewatch ||  || align=right data-sort-value="0.67" | 670 m || 
|-id=728 bgcolor=#E9E9E9
| 499728 ||  || — || January 14, 2011 || Kitt Peak || Spacewatch || ADE || align=right | 1.5 km || 
|-id=729 bgcolor=#E9E9E9
| 499729 ||  || — || January 11, 2011 || Mount Lemmon || Mount Lemmon Survey ||  || align=right | 2.0 km || 
|-id=730 bgcolor=#E9E9E9
| 499730 ||  || — || December 2, 2005 || Mount Lemmon || Mount Lemmon Survey ||  || align=right | 1.3 km || 
|-id=731 bgcolor=#fefefe
| 499731 ||  || — || December 8, 2010 || Mount Lemmon || Mount Lemmon Survey ||  || align=right data-sort-value="0.74" | 740 m || 
|-id=732 bgcolor=#E9E9E9
| 499732 ||  || — || January 23, 2011 || Mount Lemmon || Mount Lemmon Survey ||  || align=right | 1.3 km || 
|-id=733 bgcolor=#E9E9E9
| 499733 ||  || — || January 26, 2011 || Mount Lemmon || Mount Lemmon Survey ||  || align=right | 1.5 km || 
|-id=734 bgcolor=#E9E9E9
| 499734 ||  || — || December 9, 2010 || Mount Lemmon || Mount Lemmon Survey ||  || align=right data-sort-value="0.92" | 920 m || 
|-id=735 bgcolor=#E9E9E9
| 499735 ||  || — || January 13, 2011 || Kitt Peak || Spacewatch || HNS || align=right | 1.1 km || 
|-id=736 bgcolor=#fefefe
| 499736 ||  || — || January 3, 2011 || Catalina || CSS ||  || align=right data-sort-value="0.88" | 880 m || 
|-id=737 bgcolor=#fefefe
| 499737 ||  || — || January 30, 2011 || Haleakala || Pan-STARRS ||  || align=right data-sort-value="0.83" | 830 m || 
|-id=738 bgcolor=#E9E9E9
| 499738 ||  || — || January 30, 2011 || Mount Lemmon || Mount Lemmon Survey ||  || align=right | 2.6 km || 
|-id=739 bgcolor=#E9E9E9
| 499739 ||  || — || January 26, 2011 || Kitt Peak || Spacewatch ||  || align=right | 2.2 km || 
|-id=740 bgcolor=#E9E9E9
| 499740 ||  || — || January 8, 2011 || Mount Lemmon || Mount Lemmon Survey ||  || align=right data-sort-value="0.85" | 850 m || 
|-id=741 bgcolor=#E9E9E9
| 499741 ||  || — || January 30, 2011 || Haleakala || Pan-STARRS ||  || align=right data-sort-value="0.82" | 820 m || 
|-id=742 bgcolor=#E9E9E9
| 499742 ||  || — || January 30, 2011 || Haleakala || Pan-STARRS ||  || align=right | 1.5 km || 
|-id=743 bgcolor=#E9E9E9
| 499743 ||  || — || January 30, 2011 || Haleakala || Pan-STARRS ||  || align=right | 1.0 km || 
|-id=744 bgcolor=#E9E9E9
| 499744 ||  || — || January 30, 2011 || Haleakala || Pan-STARRS || MAR || align=right | 1.3 km || 
|-id=745 bgcolor=#E9E9E9
| 499745 ||  || — || December 8, 2010 || Mount Lemmon || Mount Lemmon Survey ||  || align=right data-sort-value="0.81" | 810 m || 
|-id=746 bgcolor=#fefefe
| 499746 ||  || — || January 16, 2011 || Mount Lemmon || Mount Lemmon Survey ||  || align=right data-sort-value="0.75" | 750 m || 
|-id=747 bgcolor=#E9E9E9
| 499747 ||  || — || March 9, 2007 || Kitt Peak || Spacewatch ||  || align=right | 1.1 km || 
|-id=748 bgcolor=#fefefe
| 499748 ||  || — || December 5, 2002 || Socorro || LINEAR ||  || align=right data-sort-value="0.78" | 780 m || 
|-id=749 bgcolor=#fefefe
| 499749 ||  || — || January 28, 2011 || Mount Lemmon || Mount Lemmon Survey || H || align=right data-sort-value="0.59" | 590 m || 
|-id=750 bgcolor=#E9E9E9
| 499750 ||  || — || December 8, 2010 || Mount Lemmon || Mount Lemmon Survey ||  || align=right | 1.8 km || 
|-id=751 bgcolor=#fefefe
| 499751 ||  || — || January 11, 2011 || Mount Lemmon || Mount Lemmon Survey ||  || align=right data-sort-value="0.86" | 860 m || 
|-id=752 bgcolor=#E9E9E9
| 499752 ||  || — || January 30, 2011 || Haleakala || Pan-STARRS ||  || align=right data-sort-value="0.89" | 890 m || 
|-id=753 bgcolor=#E9E9E9
| 499753 ||  || — || January 27, 2011 || Catalina || CSS || (5) || align=right data-sort-value="0.69" | 690 m || 
|-id=754 bgcolor=#E9E9E9
| 499754 ||  || — || January 10, 2007 || Kitt Peak || Spacewatch ||  || align=right data-sort-value="0.76" | 760 m || 
|-id=755 bgcolor=#E9E9E9
| 499755 ||  || — || August 26, 2009 || Catalina || CSS ||  || align=right data-sort-value="0.89" | 890 m || 
|-id=756 bgcolor=#E9E9E9
| 499756 ||  || — || January 30, 2011 || Haleakala || Pan-STARRS || EUN || align=right data-sort-value="0.85" | 850 m || 
|-id=757 bgcolor=#E9E9E9
| 499757 ||  || — || February 17, 2007 || Mount Lemmon || Mount Lemmon Survey || KAZ || align=right | 1.3 km || 
|-id=758 bgcolor=#E9E9E9
| 499758 ||  || — || January 2, 2011 || Mount Lemmon || Mount Lemmon Survey || MAR || align=right | 1.3 km || 
|-id=759 bgcolor=#fefefe
| 499759 ||  || — || January 25, 2011 || Mount Lemmon || Mount Lemmon Survey ||  || align=right data-sort-value="0.92" | 920 m || 
|-id=760 bgcolor=#E9E9E9
| 499760 ||  || — || January 14, 2011 || Kitt Peak || Spacewatch ||  || align=right data-sort-value="0.69" | 690 m || 
|-id=761 bgcolor=#fefefe
| 499761 ||  || — || January 27, 2007 || Mount Lemmon || Mount Lemmon Survey ||  || align=right data-sort-value="0.57" | 570 m || 
|-id=762 bgcolor=#E9E9E9
| 499762 ||  || — || January 14, 2011 || Kitt Peak || Spacewatch ||  || align=right | 1.4 km || 
|-id=763 bgcolor=#fefefe
| 499763 ||  || — || April 14, 2008 || Mount Lemmon || Mount Lemmon Survey ||  || align=right data-sort-value="0.87" | 870 m || 
|-id=764 bgcolor=#E9E9E9
| 499764 ||  || — || November 24, 2006 || Mount Lemmon || Mount Lemmon Survey ||  || align=right data-sort-value="0.76" | 760 m || 
|-id=765 bgcolor=#fefefe
| 499765 ||  || — || January 30, 2011 || Haleakala || Pan-STARRS ||  || align=right data-sort-value="0.82" | 820 m || 
|-id=766 bgcolor=#E9E9E9
| 499766 ||  || — || January 14, 2011 || Kitt Peak || Spacewatch ||  || align=right | 1.7 km || 
|-id=767 bgcolor=#E9E9E9
| 499767 ||  || — || January 30, 2011 || Haleakala || Pan-STARRS ||  || align=right | 1.1 km || 
|-id=768 bgcolor=#E9E9E9
| 499768 ||  || — || January 11, 2011 || Kitt Peak || Spacewatch ||  || align=right | 1.3 km || 
|-id=769 bgcolor=#E9E9E9
| 499769 ||  || — || January 30, 2011 || Haleakala || Pan-STARRS ||  || align=right | 1.5 km || 
|-id=770 bgcolor=#E9E9E9
| 499770 ||  || — || January 11, 2011 || Kitt Peak || Spacewatch ||  || align=right data-sort-value="0.70" | 700 m || 
|-id=771 bgcolor=#fefefe
| 499771 ||  || — || November 13, 2006 || Catalina || CSS ||  || align=right data-sort-value="0.74" | 740 m || 
|-id=772 bgcolor=#E9E9E9
| 499772 ||  || — || January 30, 2011 || Haleakala || Pan-STARRS ||  || align=right data-sort-value="0.95" | 950 m || 
|-id=773 bgcolor=#E9E9E9
| 499773 ||  || — || February 7, 2011 || Mount Lemmon || Mount Lemmon Survey ||  || align=right data-sort-value="0.68" | 680 m || 
|-id=774 bgcolor=#E9E9E9
| 499774 ||  || — || January 11, 2011 || Kitt Peak || Spacewatch || BRU || align=right | 2.1 km || 
|-id=775 bgcolor=#E9E9E9
| 499775 ||  || — || October 28, 2005 || Mount Lemmon || Mount Lemmon Survey ||  || align=right | 1.2 km || 
|-id=776 bgcolor=#E9E9E9
| 499776 ||  || — || January 28, 2011 || Mount Lemmon || Mount Lemmon Survey ||  || align=right | 2.1 km || 
|-id=777 bgcolor=#E9E9E9
| 499777 ||  || — || January 30, 2011 || Haleakala || Pan-STARRS || KRM || align=right | 1.9 km || 
|-id=778 bgcolor=#E9E9E9
| 499778 ||  || — || March 12, 2007 || Mount Lemmon || Mount Lemmon Survey ||  || align=right | 1.2 km || 
|-id=779 bgcolor=#fefefe
| 499779 ||  || — || January 30, 2011 || Haleakala || Pan-STARRS || H || align=right data-sort-value="0.60" | 600 m || 
|-id=780 bgcolor=#fefefe
| 499780 ||  || — || November 14, 2006 || Mount Lemmon || Mount Lemmon Survey || MAS || align=right data-sort-value="0.74" | 740 m || 
|-id=781 bgcolor=#E9E9E9
| 499781 ||  || — || December 28, 2005 || Kitt Peak || Spacewatch || DOR || align=right | 2.0 km || 
|-id=782 bgcolor=#E9E9E9
| 499782 ||  || — || March 15, 2007 || Mount Lemmon || Mount Lemmon Survey ||  || align=right data-sort-value="0.78" | 780 m || 
|-id=783 bgcolor=#E9E9E9
| 499783 ||  || — || January 30, 2011 || Mount Lemmon || Mount Lemmon Survey || KON || align=right data-sort-value="0.89" | 890 m || 
|-id=784 bgcolor=#E9E9E9
| 499784 ||  || — || January 30, 2011 || Haleakala || Pan-STARRS ||  || align=right | 2.8 km || 
|-id=785 bgcolor=#E9E9E9
| 499785 ||  || — || January 30, 2011 || Haleakala || Pan-STARRS ||  || align=right | 1.3 km || 
|-id=786 bgcolor=#E9E9E9
| 499786 ||  || — || February 7, 2011 || Mount Lemmon || Mount Lemmon Survey ||  || align=right | 1.2 km || 
|-id=787 bgcolor=#E9E9E9
| 499787 ||  || — || January 26, 2011 || Kitt Peak || Spacewatch ||  || align=right | 1.3 km || 
|-id=788 bgcolor=#E9E9E9
| 499788 ||  || — || October 27, 2005 || Kitt Peak || Spacewatch ||  || align=right data-sort-value="0.97" | 970 m || 
|-id=789 bgcolor=#E9E9E9
| 499789 ||  || — || November 25, 2009 || Mount Lemmon || Mount Lemmon Survey ||  || align=right | 1.0 km || 
|-id=790 bgcolor=#E9E9E9
| 499790 ||  || — || March 14, 2007 || Kitt Peak || Spacewatch ||  || align=right | 1.9 km || 
|-id=791 bgcolor=#E9E9E9
| 499791 ||  || — || January 30, 2011 || Haleakala || Pan-STARRS ||  || align=right | 1.9 km || 
|-id=792 bgcolor=#E9E9E9
| 499792 ||  || — || January 27, 2011 || Mount Lemmon || Mount Lemmon Survey ||  || align=right | 1.4 km || 
|-id=793 bgcolor=#E9E9E9
| 499793 ||  || — || December 9, 2010 || Mount Lemmon || Mount Lemmon Survey ||  || align=right | 1.8 km || 
|-id=794 bgcolor=#fefefe
| 499794 ||  || — || January 30, 2011 || Kitt Peak || Spacewatch || H || align=right data-sort-value="0.70" | 700 m || 
|-id=795 bgcolor=#E9E9E9
| 499795 ||  || — || January 13, 2011 || Catalina || CSS ||  || align=right | 2.0 km || 
|-id=796 bgcolor=#E9E9E9
| 499796 ||  || — || January 30, 2011 || Haleakala || Pan-STARRS ||  || align=right | 1.6 km || 
|-id=797 bgcolor=#FA8072
| 499797 ||  || — || February 11, 2011 || Mount Lemmon || Mount Lemmon Survey || H || align=right data-sort-value="0.48" | 480 m || 
|-id=798 bgcolor=#E9E9E9
| 499798 ||  || — || January 30, 2011 || Haleakala || Pan-STARRS || AGN || align=right | 1.1 km || 
|-id=799 bgcolor=#E9E9E9
| 499799 ||  || — || February 21, 2007 || Kitt Peak || Spacewatch ||  || align=right data-sort-value="0.64" | 640 m || 
|-id=800 bgcolor=#E9E9E9
| 499800 ||  || — || January 28, 2011 || Kitt Peak || Spacewatch ||  || align=right | 1.4 km || 
|}

499801–499900 

|-bgcolor=#E9E9E9
| 499801 ||  || — || January 11, 2011 || Mount Lemmon || Mount Lemmon Survey ||  || align=right | 1.6 km || 
|-id=802 bgcolor=#E9E9E9
| 499802 ||  || — || January 30, 2011 || Haleakala || Pan-STARRS ||  || align=right | 2.4 km || 
|-id=803 bgcolor=#E9E9E9
| 499803 ||  || — || January 25, 2011 || Kitt Peak || Spacewatch || HNS || align=right | 1.0 km || 
|-id=804 bgcolor=#E9E9E9
| 499804 ||  || — || February 4, 2011 || Haleakala || Pan-STARRS || ADE || align=right | 1.5 km || 
|-id=805 bgcolor=#E9E9E9
| 499805 ||  || — || March 20, 2007 || Mount Lemmon || Mount Lemmon Survey ||  || align=right | 1.2 km || 
|-id=806 bgcolor=#E9E9E9
| 499806 ||  || — || January 30, 2011 || Haleakala || Pan-STARRS || WIT || align=right | 1.2 km || 
|-id=807 bgcolor=#E9E9E9
| 499807 ||  || — || January 15, 2011 || Mount Lemmon || Mount Lemmon Survey ||  || align=right | 1.6 km || 
|-id=808 bgcolor=#E9E9E9
| 499808 ||  || — || February 1, 2010 || WISE || WISE ||  || align=right | 2.4 km || 
|-id=809 bgcolor=#E9E9E9
| 499809 ||  || — || February 21, 2007 || Mount Lemmon || Mount Lemmon Survey ||  || align=right data-sort-value="0.68" | 680 m || 
|-id=810 bgcolor=#E9E9E9
| 499810 ||  || — || January 30, 2011 || Haleakala || Pan-STARRS ||  || align=right | 1.1 km || 
|-id=811 bgcolor=#E9E9E9
| 499811 ||  || — || January 30, 2011 || Haleakala || Pan-STARRS || HNS || align=right data-sort-value="0.90" | 900 m || 
|-id=812 bgcolor=#E9E9E9
| 499812 ||  || — || March 15, 2007 || Kitt Peak || Spacewatch ||  || align=right | 1.1 km || 
|-id=813 bgcolor=#E9E9E9
| 499813 ||  || — || December 30, 2005 || Kitt Peak || Spacewatch ||  || align=right | 1.7 km || 
|-id=814 bgcolor=#E9E9E9
| 499814 ||  || — || January 30, 2011 || Haleakala || Pan-STARRS ||  || align=right | 1.3 km || 
|-id=815 bgcolor=#E9E9E9
| 499815 ||  || — || January 30, 2011 || Haleakala || Pan-STARRS ||  || align=right | 2.3 km || 
|-id=816 bgcolor=#E9E9E9
| 499816 ||  || — || February 25, 2011 || Mount Lemmon || Mount Lemmon Survey ||  || align=right | 1.1 km || 
|-id=817 bgcolor=#E9E9E9
| 499817 ||  || — || February 22, 2011 || Kitt Peak || Spacewatch ||  || align=right data-sort-value="0.73" | 730 m || 
|-id=818 bgcolor=#E9E9E9
| 499818 ||  || — || February 22, 2011 || Kitt Peak || Spacewatch ||  || align=right | 1.7 km || 
|-id=819 bgcolor=#E9E9E9
| 499819 ||  || — || January 28, 2011 || Kitt Peak || Spacewatch ||  || align=right | 2.1 km || 
|-id=820 bgcolor=#E9E9E9
| 499820 ||  || — || February 25, 2011 || La Sagra || OAM Obs. ||  || align=right | 2.0 km || 
|-id=821 bgcolor=#fefefe
| 499821 ||  || — || February 25, 2011 || Catalina || CSS || H || align=right data-sort-value="0.71" | 710 m || 
|-id=822 bgcolor=#E9E9E9
| 499822 ||  || — || March 13, 2007 || Mount Lemmon || Mount Lemmon Survey ||  || align=right data-sort-value="0.69" | 690 m || 
|-id=823 bgcolor=#E9E9E9
| 499823 ||  || — || January 30, 2011 || Haleakala || Pan-STARRS ||  || align=right data-sort-value="0.83" | 830 m || 
|-id=824 bgcolor=#E9E9E9
| 499824 ||  || — || November 3, 2010 || Kitt Peak || Spacewatch ||  || align=right | 2.0 km || 
|-id=825 bgcolor=#FA8072
| 499825 ||  || — || February 10, 2011 || Catalina || CSS ||  || align=right data-sort-value="0.97" | 970 m || 
|-id=826 bgcolor=#E9E9E9
| 499826 ||  || — || March 14, 2007 || Mount Lemmon || Mount Lemmon Survey ||  || align=right | 1.1 km || 
|-id=827 bgcolor=#E9E9E9
| 499827 ||  || — || February 26, 2011 || Kitt Peak || Spacewatch || MAR || align=right | 1.9 km || 
|-id=828 bgcolor=#E9E9E9
| 499828 ||  || — || January 29, 2011 || Mount Lemmon || Mount Lemmon Survey || MAR || align=right data-sort-value="0.97" | 970 m || 
|-id=829 bgcolor=#E9E9E9
| 499829 ||  || — || March 20, 2007 || Kitt Peak || Spacewatch ||  || align=right | 1.1 km || 
|-id=830 bgcolor=#E9E9E9
| 499830 ||  || — || December 10, 2010 || Mount Lemmon || Mount Lemmon Survey || ADE || align=right data-sort-value="0.97" | 970 m || 
|-id=831 bgcolor=#E9E9E9
| 499831 ||  || — || January 2, 2011 || Mount Lemmon || Mount Lemmon Survey ||  || align=right data-sort-value="0.96" | 960 m || 
|-id=832 bgcolor=#E9E9E9
| 499832 ||  || — || February 25, 2011 || Mount Lemmon || Mount Lemmon Survey ||  || align=right | 1.2 km || 
|-id=833 bgcolor=#E9E9E9
| 499833 ||  || — || February 25, 2011 || Mount Lemmon || Mount Lemmon Survey ||  || align=right | 1.4 km || 
|-id=834 bgcolor=#E9E9E9
| 499834 ||  || — || February 25, 2011 || Mount Lemmon || Mount Lemmon Survey ||  || align=right | 3.2 km || 
|-id=835 bgcolor=#E9E9E9
| 499835 ||  || — || April 25, 2007 || Kitt Peak || Spacewatch ||  || align=right | 1.4 km || 
|-id=836 bgcolor=#d6d6d6
| 499836 ||  || — || October 22, 2009 || Mount Lemmon || Mount Lemmon Survey ||  || align=right | 2.7 km || 
|-id=837 bgcolor=#E9E9E9
| 499837 ||  || — || April 20, 2007 || Mount Lemmon || Mount Lemmon Survey || DOR || align=right | 1.6 km || 
|-id=838 bgcolor=#E9E9E9
| 499838 ||  || — || February 21, 2007 || Kitt Peak || Spacewatch ||  || align=right | 1.1 km || 
|-id=839 bgcolor=#E9E9E9
| 499839 ||  || — || January 30, 2011 || Haleakala || Pan-STARRS ||  || align=right | 1.6 km || 
|-id=840 bgcolor=#fefefe
| 499840 ||  || — || January 27, 2003 || Socorro || LINEAR || H || align=right data-sort-value="0.79" | 790 m || 
|-id=841 bgcolor=#E9E9E9
| 499841 ||  || — || March 9, 2007 || Kitt Peak || Spacewatch ||  || align=right | 1.00 km || 
|-id=842 bgcolor=#d6d6d6
| 499842 ||  || — || February 20, 2010 || WISE || WISE || EUP || align=right | 5.1 km || 
|-id=843 bgcolor=#E9E9E9
| 499843 ||  || — || January 29, 2011 || Kitt Peak || Spacewatch ||  || align=right | 1.4 km || 
|-id=844 bgcolor=#E9E9E9
| 499844 ||  || — || January 16, 2010 || WISE || WISE ||  || align=right | 2.0 km || 
|-id=845 bgcolor=#E9E9E9
| 499845 ||  || — || March 15, 2007 || Mount Lemmon || Mount Lemmon Survey ||  || align=right | 1.2 km || 
|-id=846 bgcolor=#E9E9E9
| 499846 ||  || — || February 25, 2011 || Kitt Peak || Spacewatch || GEF || align=right | 1.9 km || 
|-id=847 bgcolor=#E9E9E9
| 499847 ||  || — || March 6, 2011 || Kitt Peak || Spacewatch ||  || align=right | 1.4 km || 
|-id=848 bgcolor=#E9E9E9
| 499848 ||  || — || January 30, 2011 || Haleakala || Pan-STARRS ||  || align=right | 1.8 km || 
|-id=849 bgcolor=#fefefe
| 499849 ||  || — || January 11, 2011 || Mount Lemmon || Mount Lemmon Survey || H || align=right data-sort-value="0.68" | 680 m || 
|-id=850 bgcolor=#E9E9E9
| 499850 ||  || — || January 29, 2011 || Kitt Peak || Spacewatch ||  || align=right data-sort-value="0.71" | 710 m || 
|-id=851 bgcolor=#E9E9E9
| 499851 ||  || — || March 14, 2007 || Mount Lemmon || Mount Lemmon Survey ||  || align=right data-sort-value="0.94" | 940 m || 
|-id=852 bgcolor=#E9E9E9
| 499852 ||  || — || April 26, 2007 || Mount Lemmon || Mount Lemmon Survey ||  || align=right | 2.9 km || 
|-id=853 bgcolor=#E9E9E9
| 499853 ||  || — || December 26, 2005 || Kitt Peak || Spacewatch ||  || align=right | 2.5 km || 
|-id=854 bgcolor=#E9E9E9
| 499854 ||  || — || February 23, 2011 || Kitt Peak || Spacewatch ||  || align=right data-sort-value="0.78" | 780 m || 
|-id=855 bgcolor=#d6d6d6
| 499855 ||  || — || March 12, 2011 || Mount Lemmon || Mount Lemmon Survey ||  || align=right | 2.7 km || 
|-id=856 bgcolor=#E9E9E9
| 499856 ||  || — || February 8, 2011 || Mount Lemmon || Mount Lemmon Survey ||  || align=right | 1.1 km || 
|-id=857 bgcolor=#d6d6d6
| 499857 ||  || — || March 10, 2011 || Kitt Peak || Spacewatch ||  || align=right | 2.0 km || 
|-id=858 bgcolor=#E9E9E9
| 499858 ||  || — || March 10, 2011 || Kitt Peak || Spacewatch ||  || align=right | 1.7 km || 
|-id=859 bgcolor=#E9E9E9
| 499859 ||  || — || March 2, 2011 || Kitt Peak || Spacewatch ||  || align=right | 1.3 km || 
|-id=860 bgcolor=#E9E9E9
| 499860 ||  || — || March 7, 2011 || Siding Spring || SSS || POS || align=right | 2.7 km || 
|-id=861 bgcolor=#E9E9E9
| 499861 ||  || — || February 25, 2011 || Kitt Peak || Spacewatch ||  || align=right | 2.0 km || 
|-id=862 bgcolor=#E9E9E9
| 499862 ||  || — || March 7, 2011 || XuYi || PMO NEO || (194) || align=right | 2.0 km || 
|-id=863 bgcolor=#E9E9E9
| 499863 ||  || — || September 28, 2009 || Mount Lemmon || Mount Lemmon Survey ||  || align=right data-sort-value="0.91" | 910 m || 
|-id=864 bgcolor=#E9E9E9
| 499864 ||  || — || February 25, 2011 || Kitt Peak || Spacewatch ||  || align=right | 1.8 km || 
|-id=865 bgcolor=#E9E9E9
| 499865 ||  || — || March 11, 2011 || Catalina || CSS ||  || align=right | 1.2 km || 
|-id=866 bgcolor=#E9E9E9
| 499866 ||  || — || September 23, 2008 || Mount Lemmon || Mount Lemmon Survey ||  || align=right | 3.0 km || 
|-id=867 bgcolor=#E9E9E9
| 499867 ||  || — || January 14, 2011 || Mount Lemmon || Mount Lemmon Survey ||  || align=right | 2.8 km || 
|-id=868 bgcolor=#E9E9E9
| 499868 ||  || — || February 25, 2011 || Kitt Peak || Spacewatch ||  || align=right | 1.6 km || 
|-id=869 bgcolor=#E9E9E9
| 499869 ||  || — || January 30, 2006 || Kitt Peak || Spacewatch ||  || align=right | 1.7 km || 
|-id=870 bgcolor=#E9E9E9
| 499870 ||  || — || March 1, 2011 || Mount Lemmon || Mount Lemmon Survey ||  || align=right | 1.4 km || 
|-id=871 bgcolor=#E9E9E9
| 499871 ||  || — || June 30, 2008 || Kitt Peak || Spacewatch ||  || align=right | 1.1 km || 
|-id=872 bgcolor=#E9E9E9
| 499872 ||  || — || January 14, 2011 || Mount Lemmon || Mount Lemmon Survey ||  || align=right | 2.5 km || 
|-id=873 bgcolor=#E9E9E9
| 499873 ||  || — || March 15, 2007 || Mount Lemmon || Mount Lemmon Survey ||  || align=right data-sort-value="0.77" | 770 m || 
|-id=874 bgcolor=#E9E9E9
| 499874 ||  || — || April 15, 2007 || Kitt Peak || Spacewatch ||  || align=right | 1.7 km || 
|-id=875 bgcolor=#E9E9E9
| 499875 ||  || — || February 10, 2011 || Mount Lemmon || Mount Lemmon Survey ||  || align=right | 1.3 km || 
|-id=876 bgcolor=#E9E9E9
| 499876 ||  || — || March 11, 2011 || Kitt Peak || Spacewatch || MAR || align=right | 2.4 km || 
|-id=877 bgcolor=#E9E9E9
| 499877 ||  || — || March 27, 2011 || Mount Lemmon || Mount Lemmon Survey ||  || align=right | 2.4 km || 
|-id=878 bgcolor=#d6d6d6
| 499878 ||  || — || March 13, 2011 || Kitt Peak || Spacewatch || HYG || align=right | 2.1 km || 
|-id=879 bgcolor=#E9E9E9
| 499879 ||  || — || January 4, 2006 || Kitt Peak || Spacewatch ||  || align=right | 1.8 km || 
|-id=880 bgcolor=#E9E9E9
| 499880 ||  || — || January 10, 2011 || Mount Lemmon || Mount Lemmon Survey ||  || align=right | 1.1 km || 
|-id=881 bgcolor=#d6d6d6
| 499881 ||  || — || April 25, 2006 || Kitt Peak || Spacewatch ||  || align=right | 4.1 km || 
|-id=882 bgcolor=#E9E9E9
| 499882 ||  || — || March 27, 2011 || Mount Lemmon || Mount Lemmon Survey ||  || align=right | 1.1 km || 
|-id=883 bgcolor=#E9E9E9
| 499883 ||  || — || February 25, 2011 || Mount Lemmon || Mount Lemmon Survey ||  || align=right | 1.1 km || 
|-id=884 bgcolor=#fefefe
| 499884 ||  || — || October 6, 1999 || Kitt Peak || Spacewatch || H || align=right data-sort-value="0.54" | 540 m || 
|-id=885 bgcolor=#d6d6d6
| 499885 ||  || — || March 24, 2011 || Catalina || CSS ||  || align=right | 2.0 km || 
|-id=886 bgcolor=#d6d6d6
| 499886 ||  || — || March 11, 2011 || Catalina || CSS ||  || align=right | 2.9 km || 
|-id=887 bgcolor=#E9E9E9
| 499887 ||  || — || October 5, 2004 || Kitt Peak || Spacewatch ||  || align=right | 1.9 km || 
|-id=888 bgcolor=#E9E9E9
| 499888 ||  || — || January 8, 2011 || Mount Lemmon || Mount Lemmon Survey ||  || align=right data-sort-value="0.99" | 990 m || 
|-id=889 bgcolor=#E9E9E9
| 499889 ||  || — || March 13, 2011 || Mount Lemmon || Mount Lemmon Survey || (5) || align=right data-sort-value="0.84" | 840 m || 
|-id=890 bgcolor=#d6d6d6
| 499890 ||  || — || March 14, 2011 || Mount Lemmon || Mount Lemmon Survey || KOR || align=right data-sort-value="0.97" | 970 m || 
|-id=891 bgcolor=#E9E9E9
| 499891 ||  || — || January 22, 2010 || WISE || WISE || BRU || align=right | 1.6 km || 
|-id=892 bgcolor=#E9E9E9
| 499892 ||  || — || January 21, 2010 || WISE || WISE ||  || align=right | 2.6 km || 
|-id=893 bgcolor=#E9E9E9
| 499893 ||  || — || December 30, 2005 || Kitt Peak || Spacewatch ||  || align=right | 1.9 km || 
|-id=894 bgcolor=#E9E9E9
| 499894 ||  || — || February 25, 2011 || Mount Lemmon || Mount Lemmon Survey || NEM || align=right | 2.0 km || 
|-id=895 bgcolor=#E9E9E9
| 499895 ||  || — || October 1, 2008 || Mount Lemmon || Mount Lemmon Survey ||  || align=right | 1.8 km || 
|-id=896 bgcolor=#fefefe
| 499896 ||  || — || March 26, 2011 || Haleakala || Pan-STARRS || H || align=right data-sort-value="0.71" | 710 m || 
|-id=897 bgcolor=#d6d6d6
| 499897 ||  || — || September 10, 2007 || Kitt Peak || Spacewatch ||  || align=right | 2.4 km || 
|-id=898 bgcolor=#E9E9E9
| 499898 ||  || — || April 18, 2007 || Kitt Peak || Spacewatch || NEM || align=right | 2.5 km || 
|-id=899 bgcolor=#E9E9E9
| 499899 ||  || — || May 11, 2007 || Mount Lemmon || Mount Lemmon Survey ||  || align=right | 2.3 km || 
|-id=900 bgcolor=#E9E9E9
| 499900 ||  || — || March 26, 2011 || Haleakala || Pan-STARRS ||  || align=right data-sort-value="0.91" | 910 m || 
|}

499901–500000 

|-bgcolor=#E9E9E9
| 499901 ||  || — || January 16, 2011 || Mount Lemmon || Mount Lemmon Survey ||  || align=right | 1.6 km || 
|-id=902 bgcolor=#d6d6d6
| 499902 ||  || — || March 11, 2011 || Mount Lemmon || Mount Lemmon Survey ||  || align=right | 2.4 km || 
|-id=903 bgcolor=#E9E9E9
| 499903 ||  || — || January 14, 2011 || Kitt Peak || Spacewatch || HNS || align=right | 1.5 km || 
|-id=904 bgcolor=#E9E9E9
| 499904 ||  || — || September 4, 2008 || Kitt Peak || Spacewatch ||  || align=right | 1.9 km || 
|-id=905 bgcolor=#E9E9E9
| 499905 ||  || — || March 28, 2011 || Kitt Peak || Spacewatch || AGN || align=right | 1.9 km || 
|-id=906 bgcolor=#E9E9E9
| 499906 ||  || — || April 3, 2011 || Haleakala || Pan-STARRS ||  || align=right | 1.8 km || 
|-id=907 bgcolor=#E9E9E9
| 499907 ||  || — || March 27, 2011 || Mount Lemmon || Mount Lemmon Survey || MRX || align=right data-sort-value="0.88" | 880 m || 
|-id=908 bgcolor=#E9E9E9
| 499908 ||  || — || March 14, 2007 || Kitt Peak || Spacewatch ||  || align=right data-sort-value="0.70" | 700 m || 
|-id=909 bgcolor=#d6d6d6
| 499909 ||  || — || May 25, 2006 || Mount Lemmon || Mount Lemmon Survey ||  || align=right | 2.4 km || 
|-id=910 bgcolor=#fefefe
| 499910 ||  || — || March 1, 2011 || Mount Lemmon || Mount Lemmon Survey || H || align=right data-sort-value="0.62" | 620 m || 
|-id=911 bgcolor=#E9E9E9
| 499911 ||  || — || March 9, 2011 || Kitt Peak || Spacewatch ||  || align=right | 1.7 km || 
|-id=912 bgcolor=#E9E9E9
| 499912 ||  || — || January 22, 2006 || Mount Lemmon || Mount Lemmon Survey ||  || align=right | 1.7 km || 
|-id=913 bgcolor=#E9E9E9
| 499913 ||  || — || February 27, 2006 || Catalina || CSS ||  || align=right | 3.3 km || 
|-id=914 bgcolor=#E9E9E9
| 499914 ||  || — || March 2, 2011 || Kitt Peak || Spacewatch ||  || align=right | 1.6 km || 
|-id=915 bgcolor=#E9E9E9
| 499915 ||  || — || March 26, 2011 || Mount Lemmon || Mount Lemmon Survey ||  || align=right | 1.9 km || 
|-id=916 bgcolor=#E9E9E9
| 499916 ||  || — || January 28, 2006 || Kitt Peak || Spacewatch || DOR || align=right | 1.9 km || 
|-id=917 bgcolor=#fefefe
| 499917 ||  || — || April 2, 2011 || Haleakala || Pan-STARRS || H || align=right data-sort-value="0.67" | 670 m || 
|-id=918 bgcolor=#d6d6d6
| 499918 ||  || — || April 13, 2011 || Mount Lemmon || Mount Lemmon Survey ||  || align=right | 2.2 km || 
|-id=919 bgcolor=#d6d6d6
| 499919 ||  || — || January 6, 2010 || Kitt Peak || Spacewatch ||  || align=right | 2.8 km || 
|-id=920 bgcolor=#d6d6d6
| 499920 ||  || — || April 13, 2011 || Mount Lemmon || Mount Lemmon Survey || EOS || align=right | 2.4 km || 
|-id=921 bgcolor=#fefefe
| 499921 ||  || — || September 16, 2006 || Catalina || CSS || H || align=right data-sort-value="0.88" | 880 m || 
|-id=922 bgcolor=#fefefe
| 499922 ||  || — || April 6, 2011 || Mount Lemmon || Mount Lemmon Survey || H || align=right data-sort-value="0.77" | 770 m || 
|-id=923 bgcolor=#fefefe
| 499923 ||  || — || September 16, 2009 || Kitt Peak || Spacewatch || H || align=right data-sort-value="0.73" | 730 m || 
|-id=924 bgcolor=#E9E9E9
| 499924 ||  || — || April 26, 2011 || Kitt Peak || Spacewatch || EUN || align=right | 1.9 km || 
|-id=925 bgcolor=#E9E9E9
| 499925 ||  || — || March 30, 2011 || Mount Lemmon || Mount Lemmon Survey ||  || align=right | 2.0 km || 
|-id=926 bgcolor=#d6d6d6
| 499926 ||  || — || April 4, 2011 || Kitt Peak || Spacewatch ||  || align=right | 2.1 km || 
|-id=927 bgcolor=#d6d6d6
| 499927 ||  || — || April 8, 2006 || Kitt Peak || Spacewatch ||  || align=right | 2.0 km || 
|-id=928 bgcolor=#E9E9E9
| 499928 ||  || — || April 7, 2011 || Kitt Peak || Spacewatch || ADE || align=right | 1.8 km || 
|-id=929 bgcolor=#d6d6d6
| 499929 ||  || — || February 4, 2005 || Kitt Peak || Spacewatch ||  || align=right | 2.4 km || 
|-id=930 bgcolor=#d6d6d6
| 499930 ||  || — || September 22, 2006 || Catalina || CSS ||  || align=right | 2.1 km || 
|-id=931 bgcolor=#fefefe
| 499931 ||  || — || April 28, 2011 || Haleakala || Pan-STARRS || H || align=right data-sort-value="0.98" | 980 m || 
|-id=932 bgcolor=#E9E9E9
| 499932 ||  || — || April 6, 2011 || Mount Lemmon || Mount Lemmon Survey ||  || align=right | 2.2 km || 
|-id=933 bgcolor=#E9E9E9
| 499933 ||  || — || September 5, 2008 || Kitt Peak || Spacewatch ||  || align=right | 1.6 km || 
|-id=934 bgcolor=#fefefe
| 499934 ||  || — || March 31, 2011 || Haleakala || Pan-STARRS || H || align=right data-sort-value="0.64" | 640 m || 
|-id=935 bgcolor=#E9E9E9
| 499935 ||  || — || April 27, 2011 || Kitt Peak || Spacewatch || BAR || align=right | 2.0 km || 
|-id=936 bgcolor=#E9E9E9
| 499936 ||  || — || March 31, 2011 || Mount Lemmon || Mount Lemmon Survey ||  || align=right data-sort-value="0.82" | 820 m || 
|-id=937 bgcolor=#d6d6d6
| 499937 ||  || — || March 1, 2011 || Mount Lemmon || Mount Lemmon Survey ||  || align=right | 2.0 km || 
|-id=938 bgcolor=#d6d6d6
| 499938 ||  || — || April 27, 2011 || Haleakala || Pan-STARRS ||  || align=right | 2.7 km || 
|-id=939 bgcolor=#E9E9E9
| 499939 ||  || — || April 30, 2011 || Kitt Peak || Spacewatch ||  || align=right | 2.0 km || 
|-id=940 bgcolor=#E9E9E9
| 499940 ||  || — || February 23, 2006 || Anderson Mesa || LONEOS ||  || align=right | 2.5 km || 
|-id=941 bgcolor=#d6d6d6
| 499941 ||  || — || April 28, 2011 || Kitt Peak || Spacewatch || NAE || align=right | 2.1 km || 
|-id=942 bgcolor=#d6d6d6
| 499942 ||  || — || April 24, 2011 || Kitt Peak || Spacewatch ||  || align=right | 2.6 km || 
|-id=943 bgcolor=#fefefe
| 499943 ||  || — || May 26, 2006 || Kitt Peak || Spacewatch || H || align=right data-sort-value="0.53" | 530 m || 
|-id=944 bgcolor=#E9E9E9
| 499944 ||  || — || April 22, 2011 || Kitt Peak || Spacewatch ||  || align=right | 2.2 km || 
|-id=945 bgcolor=#E9E9E9
| 499945 ||  || — || March 27, 2011 || Mount Lemmon || Mount Lemmon Survey || DOR || align=right | 2.2 km || 
|-id=946 bgcolor=#E9E9E9
| 499946 ||  || — || April 28, 2011 || Kitt Peak || Spacewatch ||  || align=right | 2.5 km || 
|-id=947 bgcolor=#E9E9E9
| 499947 ||  || — || September 23, 2008 || Mount Lemmon || Mount Lemmon Survey || GEF || align=right | 3.0 km || 
|-id=948 bgcolor=#E9E9E9
| 499948 ||  || — || November 7, 2008 || Mount Lemmon || Mount Lemmon Survey ||  || align=right | 1.9 km || 
|-id=949 bgcolor=#E9E9E9
| 499949 ||  || — || April 6, 2011 || Mount Lemmon || Mount Lemmon Survey ||  || align=right | 1.3 km || 
|-id=950 bgcolor=#E9E9E9
| 499950 ||  || — || June 12, 2007 || Kitt Peak || Spacewatch ||  || align=right | 1.7 km || 
|-id=951 bgcolor=#d6d6d6
| 499951 ||  || — || October 11, 2007 || Catalina || CSS ||  || align=right | 3.0 km || 
|-id=952 bgcolor=#d6d6d6
| 499952 ||  || — || April 27, 2011 || Kitt Peak || Spacewatch ||  || align=right | 2.4 km || 
|-id=953 bgcolor=#d6d6d6
| 499953 ||  || — || April 28, 2011 || Haleakala || Pan-STARRS ||  || align=right | 2.7 km || 
|-id=954 bgcolor=#d6d6d6
| 499954 ||  || — || May 1, 2011 || Haleakala || Pan-STARRS ||  || align=right | 2.7 km || 
|-id=955 bgcolor=#d6d6d6
| 499955 ||  || — || April 1, 2011 || Kitt Peak || Spacewatch ||  || align=right | 1.7 km || 
|-id=956 bgcolor=#d6d6d6
| 499956 ||  || — || March 27, 2011 || Kitt Peak || Spacewatch ||  || align=right | 2.4 km || 
|-id=957 bgcolor=#fefefe
| 499957 ||  || — || April 4, 2011 || Catalina || CSS || H || align=right data-sort-value="0.69" | 690 m || 
|-id=958 bgcolor=#d6d6d6
| 499958 ||  || — || March 10, 2005 || Mount Lemmon || Mount Lemmon Survey || AEG || align=right | 1.9 km || 
|-id=959 bgcolor=#d6d6d6
| 499959 ||  || — || May 1, 2011 || Haleakala || Pan-STARRS ||  || align=right | 3.3 km || 
|-id=960 bgcolor=#d6d6d6
| 499960 ||  || — || April 28, 2011 || Kitt Peak || Spacewatch || LIX || align=right | 2.6 km || 
|-id=961 bgcolor=#E9E9E9
| 499961 ||  || — || April 2, 2011 || Mount Lemmon || Mount Lemmon Survey ||  || align=right | 1.2 km || 
|-id=962 bgcolor=#d6d6d6
| 499962 ||  || — || April 13, 2011 || Haleakala || Pan-STARRS ||  || align=right | 2.7 km || 
|-id=963 bgcolor=#d6d6d6
| 499963 ||  || — || January 30, 2011 || Haleakala || Pan-STARRS ||  || align=right | 2.7 km || 
|-id=964 bgcolor=#d6d6d6
| 499964 ||  || — || May 3, 2011 || Mount Lemmon || Mount Lemmon Survey ||  || align=right | 1.9 km || 
|-id=965 bgcolor=#d6d6d6
| 499965 ||  || — || January 30, 2011 || Haleakala || Pan-STARRS ||  || align=right | 2.5 km || 
|-id=966 bgcolor=#d6d6d6
| 499966 ||  || — || May 24, 2011 || Haleakala || Pan-STARRS || EMA || align=right | 3.1 km || 
|-id=967 bgcolor=#d6d6d6
| 499967 ||  || — || March 8, 2005 || Mount Lemmon || Mount Lemmon Survey ||  || align=right | 2.0 km || 
|-id=968 bgcolor=#d6d6d6
| 499968 ||  || — || May 27, 2011 || Kitt Peak || Spacewatch ||  || align=right | 2.7 km || 
|-id=969 bgcolor=#d6d6d6
| 499969 ||  || — || May 9, 2011 || Mount Lemmon || Mount Lemmon Survey || HYG || align=right | 2.7 km || 
|-id=970 bgcolor=#fefefe
| 499970 ||  || — || May 30, 2011 || Haleakala || Pan-STARRS ||  || align=right data-sort-value="0.88" | 880 m || 
|-id=971 bgcolor=#E9E9E9
| 499971 ||  || — || March 31, 2010 || WISE || WISE ||  || align=right | 2.4 km || 
|-id=972 bgcolor=#d6d6d6
| 499972 ||  || — || September 13, 2007 || Mount Lemmon || Mount Lemmon Survey || THM || align=right | 2.6 km || 
|-id=973 bgcolor=#E9E9E9
| 499973 ||  || — || April 27, 2011 || Mount Lemmon || Mount Lemmon Survey || GEF || align=right | 2.3 km || 
|-id=974 bgcolor=#d6d6d6
| 499974 ||  || — || April 30, 2011 || Mount Lemmon || Mount Lemmon Survey ||  || align=right | 2.7 km || 
|-id=975 bgcolor=#d6d6d6
| 499975 ||  || — || January 30, 2011 || Haleakala || Pan-STARRS ||  || align=right | 3.1 km || 
|-id=976 bgcolor=#d6d6d6
| 499976 ||  || — || March 4, 2005 || Mount Lemmon || Mount Lemmon Survey ||  || align=right | 2.1 km || 
|-id=977 bgcolor=#d6d6d6
| 499977 ||  || — || May 27, 2011 || Kitt Peak || Spacewatch ||  || align=right | 2.3 km || 
|-id=978 bgcolor=#d6d6d6
| 499978 ||  || — || May 22, 2011 || Mount Lemmon || Mount Lemmon Survey ||  || align=right | 2.3 km || 
|-id=979 bgcolor=#d6d6d6
| 499979 ||  || — || May 7, 2000 || Kitt Peak || Spacewatch ||  || align=right | 3.0 km || 
|-id=980 bgcolor=#d6d6d6
| 499980 ||  || — || August 25, 2001 || Socorro || LINEAR ||  || align=right | 2.6 km || 
|-id=981 bgcolor=#d6d6d6
| 499981 ||  || — || June 11, 2011 || Mount Lemmon || Mount Lemmon Survey || TIR || align=right | 2.7 km || 
|-id=982 bgcolor=#d6d6d6
| 499982 ||  || — || February 2, 2005 || Kitt Peak || Spacewatch ||  || align=right | 1.8 km || 
|-id=983 bgcolor=#d6d6d6
| 499983 ||  || — || June 26, 2011 || Mount Lemmon || Mount Lemmon Survey || THB || align=right | 2.7 km || 
|-id=984 bgcolor=#d6d6d6
| 499984 ||  || — || November 8, 2007 || Catalina || CSS ||  || align=right | 3.8 km || 
|-id=985 bgcolor=#d6d6d6
| 499985 ||  || — || May 17, 2001 || Kitt Peak || Spacewatch ||  || align=right | 3.3 km || 
|-id=986 bgcolor=#FFC2E0
| 499986 ||  || — || July 3, 2011 || Catalina || CSS || AMO || align=right data-sort-value="0.37" | 370 m || 
|-id=987 bgcolor=#d6d6d6
| 499987 ||  || — || July 23, 2011 || Haleakala || Pan-STARRS ||  || align=right | 2.2 km || 
|-id=988 bgcolor=#d6d6d6
| 499988 ||  || — || July 26, 2011 || Haleakala || Pan-STARRS ||  || align=right | 3.1 km || 
|-id=989 bgcolor=#d6d6d6
| 499989 ||  || — || July 22, 2011 || Haleakala || Pan-STARRS || TIR || align=right | 2.9 km || 
|-id=990 bgcolor=#d6d6d6
| 499990 ||  || — || June 27, 2011 || Kitt Peak || Spacewatch || EOS || align=right | 2.7 km || 
|-id=991 bgcolor=#d6d6d6
| 499991 ||  || — || July 28, 2011 || Siding Spring || SSS || Tj (2.96) || align=right | 3.8 km || 
|-id=992 bgcolor=#d6d6d6
| 499992 ||  || — || August 31, 2000 || Socorro || LINEAR ||  || align=right | 3.6 km || 
|-id=993 bgcolor=#d6d6d6
| 499993 ||  || — || June 24, 2010 || WISE || WISE || LIX || align=right | 2.9 km || 
|-id=994 bgcolor=#d6d6d6
| 499994 ||  || — || July 2, 2010 || WISE || WISE ||  || align=right | 2.9 km || 
|-id=995 bgcolor=#d6d6d6
| 499995 ||  || — || July 6, 2010 || WISE || WISE || LIX || align=right | 3.4 km || 
|-id=996 bgcolor=#d6d6d6
| 499996 ||  || — || January 30, 2008 || Catalina || CSS ||  || align=right | 4.2 km || 
|-id=997 bgcolor=#d6d6d6
| 499997 ||  || — || July 27, 2011 || Haleakala || Pan-STARRS ||  || align=right | 3.7 km || 
|-id=998 bgcolor=#FFC2E0
| 499998 ||  || — || August 1, 2011 || Haleakala || Pan-STARRS || AMOcritical || align=right data-sort-value="0.059" | 59 m || 
|-id=999 bgcolor=#d6d6d6
| 499999 ||  || — || April 15, 2010 || Mount Lemmon || Mount Lemmon Survey || LIX || align=right | 3.3 km || 
|-id=000 bgcolor=#d6d6d6
| 500000 ||  || — || August 4, 2011 || Haleakala || Pan-STARRS ||  || align=right | 3.7 km || 
|}

References

External links 
 Discovery Circumstances: Numbered Minor Planets (495001)–(500000) (IAU Minor Planet Center)

0499